= FEMA camps conspiracy theory =

Belief that US citizens will be imprisoned as a New World Order is established

The FEMA camps conspiracy theory is a belief, particularly within the American Patriot movement, that the United States Federal Emergency Management Agency (FEMA) is planning to imprison United States citizens in concentration camps, following the imposition of martial law in the United States after a major disaster or crisis. In some versions of the theory, only suspected dissidents will be imprisoned. In more extreme versions, large numbers of United States citizens will be imprisoned for the purposes of extermination as a New World Order is established. The theory has existed since the late 1970s, but its circulation has increased with the advent of the internet and social media platforms.

The US government imprisoned Japanese-American citizens in internment camps during WWII and developed, but did not implement, the Rex 84 contingency plan for mass internment of US citizens in the 1980s.

== About FEMA ==
FEMA is a United States government agency tasked with the effective management of major emergencies within the country, including ensuring the continuity of government during a large-scale disaster including a nuclear war. It provides federal relief to areas afflicted by natural disasters. The precursor agency to FEMA was the Federal Civil Defense Administration established by President Harry S Truman in 1950 with Executive Order 10186.

FEMA was established in 1979 under Executive Order 12127 by President Jimmy Carter. It was established to coordinate the response to any major disaster that has occurred in the United States that overwhelms local and state authorities. In 2002, it was finally codified into law and made a component of the Department of Homeland Security. As well as providing large-scale emergency-management, FEMA is also the largest flood-insurer in the United States, mainly because most private insurance companies do not offer flood insurance.

Proponents of the conspiracy theory argue FEMA's mission is a cover up for its "real" purpose — to assume control of the United States following a major disaster or threat — and that the organization is "the executive arm of the coming police state".

== Variations ==
The theory in general states that once a disaster, or threat of one occurs, martial law will be declared and FEMA's emergency powers will come into operation, and it will effectively become the government. The Constitution will be suspended, and citizens will be moved into camps.

In many versions, "dissidents" or members of the patriot movement will merely be imprisoned. Others argue that they will be sent to these camps to be murdered. Extreme versions state that plans are in place to imprison and kill apolitical American citizens in camps as part of a "population control" plot. In April 2014, Snopes posted a claim that FEMA was marking houses by political affiliation to round people up for these camps. In reality the bright, color coded stickers served varying purposes for newspaper and mail delivery personnel.

Although they do not mention FEMA specifically, the Oath Keepers' list of 10 "Orders We Will Not Obey" includes actions that are feared by many proponents of FEMA conspiracy theories. Proponents often play into racial fear, asserting that FEMA will use "urban gangs" as auxiliaries to ensure order. FEMA conspiracy theories are often woven into larger conspiracy narratives about ushering in a "New World Order", meaning a totalitarian world government.

== History ==
One of the first known references to FEMA concentration camps came from a newsletter issued by the Posse Comitatus organization in 1982, with the warning that "hardcore patriots" were to be detained in them. The prevalence of the conspiracy theory increased in line with the rise of the militia movement in the 1990s. The conspiracy was part of the rhetoric of the now largely disbanded Militia of Montana. The self-styled congressional analyst David Fletcher was their spokesman and brought it up in meetings, even pointing out "United Nations Reserves" that the government was building camps for in the Northern Cascades.

A supposed FEMA camp was featured in Linda Thompson's 1994 film America Under Siege; in reality, the "FEMA camp" was an Amtrak repair facility. She accused the government of using "black helicopters" against patriots to prevent them from interfering with plans to establish a New World Order. Following the 1995 Oklahoma City bombing, the conspiracy theory was discussed by the Senate Judiciary Subcommittee on Domestic Terrorism. The theory's inclusion in the plot of the 1998 X-Files movie showed its growing reach. After the film's release, FEMA spokesperson Morrie Goodman told the Washington Post: people have come to believe that the agency has “all kinds of powers we don’t have, that we can put people in concentration camps and suspend the Constitution.”

Fears of FEMA declined in the early 2000s as foreign terrorists were perceived as the major threat but the late-2000s recession and the election of Barack Obama renewed opposition among conservatives, to the federal government. Obama's election also enabled the theory to reach more mainstream right-wing circles whereas it had previously been confined to the fringes. There was a resurgence in the militia movement, and with it a resurgence of the FEMA camps conspiracy theory and a corresponding boom in the "prepper" economy. Reader emails published by the magazine National Review have also promoted the theory.

Congresswoman Michele Bachmann alluded to the theory while in office, as have other Republican Party politicians. In December 2011 Camille Marino of the animal liberation website Negotiation is Over posted an alert on her website titled "Military Now Recruiting Guards for FEMA Domestic Detainment/Internment Camps" containing the usual warnings about the end of civil liberties and the announcement that the U.S. Army is looking for "a Few Good Totalitarians" to herd dissenters into camps.

In 2015, fears of the FEMA roundup beginning surfaced with the announcement of a domestic military training operation called Jade Helm 15. County and state officials in Texas denounced the fears and the exercise was completed with no one being placed into an internment camp. Also in 2015, additional speculation about the theory was stoked by retired general Wesley Clark when he called for World War II-style internment camps to be revived to combat Muslim extremism. He stated, "If these people are radicalized and they do not support the United States and they're disloyal to the United States as a matter of principle, fine, that's their right. It’s our right and our obligation to segregate them from the normal community for the duration of the conflict."

According to the Las Vegas Police Department and witnesses in the weeks leading up to the 2017 Las Vegas shooting, gunman Stephen Paddock reportedly espoused right-wing anti-government and conspiratorial views, including FEMA conspiracies. He reportedly told a friend that "sometimes, sacrifices have to be made" in order to encourage the American public to arm themselves.

Conspiracy theorists have used the actual internment of Japanese Americans during World War II in specifically constructed camps as evidence that such a scenario has historic precedent. Proponents have cited a contingency plan (Rex 84) drafted in part by U.S. Marine Colonel Oliver North calling for the suspension of the Constitution and the detainment of citizens in the event of a national crisis. This was aimed at left-wing activists, not the libertarians and right-wingers generally associated with FEMA theories. This has been linked to a 1970 document by Louis Giuffrida (who in 1981 became the director of FEMA) calling for the establishment of martial law in the event of an uprising by African American militants and the internment of millions of African Americans.

Alex Jones has promoted conspiracy theories about FEMA on InfoWars. In 2010, Jones produced and directed Police State 4: The Rise of FEMA, a film he claimed "conclusively proves the existence of a secret network of FEMA camps" and that "The military-industrial complex is transforming our once free nation into a giant prison camp." In 2012, Jones linked to a story titled "List of All FEMA Concentration Camps in America Revealed" from the German UFO conspiracy website Disclose.tv.

In 2015, after Superstorm Sandy, the US Army announced it would begin Jade Helm 15 training. Conspiracists began to spread the theory that dome-shaped roofs paid for by FEMA were connected to Jade Helm and made to detain insurrectionists, while they were really created for people to shelter from the hurricanes.

During the COVID-19 pandemic, an agreement was made that would allow FEMA to provide noncongregate shelters for those who wouldn't be able to quarantine in their own homes. Many began speculating that this was another iteration of FEMA camps.

== Media attention ==
Popular Mechanics has debunked some of the claims that proponents of the theory make. FOX News personality Glenn Beck did a 2009 interview with James Meigs, editor-in-chief of "Popular Mechanics", during which he debunked the existence of one purported camp. "This video," Meigs said, "actually dates from about 1995. But like so many of these conspiracy theories, it gets re-cut and re-edited and circulated around the Internet." Bloggers at the Skeptic Project have posted detailed lists where they claim to debunk many of the FEMA camp locations elsewhere in the U.S.

Newsweek emailed FEMA to inquire about the FEMA camps rumors. Press Secretary Alexa Lopez replied, "We are currently focusing our efforts on providing assistance to disaster survivors, and the ongoing response and recovery efforts in Louisiana. As to your first question, over the years there have been many myths or rumors surrounding FEMA, and I am glad I have the chance to set the record straight with you. There is absolutely no truth to these rumors—they are nothing more than conspiracy theories." One internal FEMA memo advised ex-employees: "Most people know us as the agency that responds to natural disasters. Others believe we have a somewhat sinister role. For the latter, it is not realistic to think that we can convince them otherwise and it is advisable not to enter into debate on the subject."

== In popular culture ==
- In Deus Ex: Human Revolution, Adam Jensen has to visit one such camp.
- In The X Files: Fight the Future, FEMA is depicted as an agency involved in a cover-up related to an alien invasion and a sinister government plot

== See also ==
- FBI Index – System used to track American citizens and other people
- Misinformation about the 2024 Atlantic hurricane season
- List of conspiracy theories
