= List of proclamations by Joe Biden (2024–25) =

The president of the United States may take any of several kinds of executive actions.

Executive orders are issued to help officers and agencies of the executive branch manage the operations within the federal government itself. Presidential memoranda are closely related, and have the force of law on the Executive Branch, but are generally considered less prestigious. Presidential memoranda do not have an established process for issuance, and unlike executive orders, they are not numbered. A presidential determination results in an official policy or position of the executive branch of the United States government. A presidential proclamation is a statement issued by a president on a matter of public policy, under specific authority granted to the president by Congress, typically on a matter of widespread interest. Administrative orders are signed documents such as notices, letters, and orders, that can be issued to conduct administrative operations of the federal government. A presidential notice or a presidential sequestration order can also be issued. National security directives (Note: National Security and Homeland Security Presidential Directives address continuity of government in the event of a "catastrophic emergency" disrupting the U.S. population, economy, environment, infrastructure and government policy.) operate like executive orders, but are only in the area of national security. They have been issued by different presidents under various names.

Listed below are the presidential proclamations signed by United States President Joe Biden, beginning with Proclamation 10140. President Biden has signed 745 presidential proclamations.

== Presidential proclamations ==
View source data.
Cumulative number of proclamations signed by Joe Biden

=== 2024 ===
Relative no.	Absolute no.	Title / description	Date signed	Date published	FR citation	FR doc. number	Ref.
557	10696	Martin Luther King Jr., Federal Holiday, 2024	January 12, 2024	January 19, 2024	89 FR 3533	2024-01114	
558	10697	Religious Freedom Day, 2024	January 12, 2024	January 19, 2024	89 FR 3535	2024-01115	
559	10698	American Heart Month, 2024	January 31, 2024	February 5, 2024	89 FR 7599	2024-02343	
560	10699	National Black History Month, 2024	January 31, 2024	February 5, 2024	89 FR 7601	2024-02344	
561	10700	National Teen Dating Violence Awareness and Prevention Month, 2024	January 31, 2024	February 5, 2024	89 FR 7603	2024-02349	
562	10701	National Tribal Colleges and Universities Week, 2024	February 6, 2024	February 12, 2024	89 FR 9739	2024-02934	
563	10702	National Eating Disorders Awareness Week, 2024	February 23, 2024	February 28, 2024	89 FR 14561	2024-04258	
564	10703	American Red Cross Month, 2024	February 29, 2024	March 5, 2024	89 FR 15933	2024-04812	
565	10704	Irish-American Heritage Month, 2024	February 29, 2024	March 5, 2024	89 FR 15935	2024-04813	
566	10705	National Colorectal Cancer Awareness Month, 2024	February 29, 2024	March 5, 2024	89 FR 15937	2024-04818	
567	10706	Women's History Month, 2024	February 29, 2024	March 5, 2024	89 FR 15939	2024-04819	
568	10707	National Consumer Protection Week, 2024	March 1, 2024	March 6, 2024	89 FR 15949	2024-04876	
569	10708	Read Across America Day, 2024	March 1, 2024	March 6, 2024	89 FR 15953	2024-04877	
570	10709	U.S. Hostage and Wrongful Detainee Day, 2024	March 8, 2024	March 13, 2024	89 FR 18339	2024-05441	
571	10710	National Equal Pay Day, 2024	March 11, 2024	March 14, 2024	89 FR 18529	2024-05587	
572	10711	National Poison Prevention Week, 2024	March 15, 2024	March 20, 2024	89 FR 19727	2024-06024	
573	10712	National Agriculture Day, 2024	March 18, 2024	March 21, 2024	89 FR 20093	2024-06122	
574	10713	Greek Independence Day: A National Day of Celebration of Greek and American Democracy, 2024	March 22, 2024	March 27, 2024	89 FR 21177	2024-06658	
575	10714	Arab American Heritage Month, 2024	March 29, 2024	April 3, 2024	89 FR 22879	2024-07173	
576	10715	Care Workers Recognition Month, 2024	March 29, 2024	April 3, 2024	89 FR 22881	2024-07174	
577	10716	Month of the Military Child, 2024	March 29, 2024	April 3, 2024	89 FR 22883	2024-07179	
578	10717	National Cancer Prevention and Early Detection Month, 2024	March 29, 2024	April 3, 2024	89 FR 22885	2024-07188	
579	10718	National Child Abuse Prevention Month, 2024	March 29, 2024	April 3, 2024	89 FR 22887	2024-07189	
580	10719	National Donate Life Month, 2024	March 29, 2024	April 3, 2024	89 FR 22889	2024-07190	
581	10720	National Sexual Assault Awareness and Prevention Month, 2024	March 29, 2024	April 3, 2024	89 FR 22891	2024-07193	
582	10721	Second Chance Month, 2024	March 29, 2024	April 3, 2024	89 FR 22893	2024-07194	
583	10722	National Public Health Week, 2024	March 29, 2024	April 3, 2024	89 FR 22895	2024-07195	
584	10723	César Chávez Day, 2024	March 29, 2024	April 3, 2024	89 FR 22899	2024-07196	
585	10724	Transgender Day of Visibility, 2024	March 29, 2024	April 3, 2024	89 FR 22901	2024-07197	
586	10725	World Autism Awareness Day, 2024	April 1, 2024	April 4, 2024	89 FR 23497	2024-07284	
587	10726	National Former Prisoner of War Recognition Day, 2024	April 8, 2024	April 11, 2024	89 FR 25747	2024-07844	
588	10727	Black Maternal Health Week, 2024	April 10, 2024	April 15, 2024	89 FR 26103	2024-08063	
589	10728	Education and Sharing Day, USA, 2024	April 18, 2024	April 23, 2024	89 FR 30257	2024-08787	
590	10729	National Park Week, 2024	April 19, 2024	April 24, 2024	89 FR 31065	2024-08904	
591	10730	National Crime Victims' Rights Week, 2024	April 19, 2024	April 24, 2024	89 FR 31067	2024-08908	
592	10731	National Volunteer Week, 2024	April 19, 2024	April 24, 2024	89 FR 31071	2024-08910	
593	10732	Earth Day, 2024	April 19, 2024	April 24, 2024	89 FR 31073	2024-08911	
594	10733	National Small Business Week, 2024	April 26, 2024	May 1, 2024	89 FR 34945	2024-09551	
595	10734	Workers Memorial Day, 2024	April 26, 2024	May 1, 2024	89 FR 34949	2024-09552	
596	10735	Asian American, Native Hawaiian, and Pacific Islander Heritage Month, 2024	April 30, 2024	May 3, 2024	89 FR 36651	2024-09808	
597	10736	Jewish American Heritage Month, 2024	April 30, 2024	May 3, 2024	89 FR 36655	2024-09813	
598	10737	National Building Safety Month, 2024	April 30, 2024	May 3, 2024	89 FR 36657	2024-09814	
599	10738	National Foster Care Month, 2024	April 30, 2024	May 3, 2024	89 FR 36659	2024-09818	
600	10739	National Mental Health Awareness Month, 2024	April 30, 2024	May 3, 2024	89 FR 36661	2024-09819	
601	10740	National Physical Fitness and Sports Month, 2024	April 30, 2024	May 3, 2024	89 FR 36663	2024-09820	
602	10741	Older Americans Month, 2024	April 30, 2024	May 3, 2024	89 FR 36665	2024-09821	
603	10742	Law Day, U.S.A., 2024	April 30, 2024	May 3, 2024	89 FR 36667	2024-09822	
604	10743	Loyalty Day, 2024	April 30, 2024	May 3, 2024	89 FR 36669	2024-09823	
605	10744	National Day of Prayer, 2024	May 1, 2024	May 6, 2024	89 FR 37059	2024-09919	
606	10745	Boundary Enlargement of the Berryessa Snow Mountain National Monument	May 2, 2024	May 9, 2024	89 FR 39531	2024-10266	
607	10746	Boundary Enlargement of the San Gabriel Mountains National Monument	May 2, 2024	May 10, 2024	89 FR 40361	2024-10408	
608	10747	Days of Remembrance of the Victims of the Holocaust, 2024	May 3, 2024	May 13, 2024	89 FR 41287	2024-10523	
609	10748	National Hurricane Preparedness Week, 2024	May 3, 2024	May 13, 2024	89 FR 41289	2024-10524	
610	10749	Public Service Recognition Week, 2024	May 3, 2024	May 13, 2024	89 FR 41291	2024-10526	
611	10750	National Teacher Appreciation Day and National Teacher Appreciation Week, 2024	May 3, 2024	May 13, 2024	89 FR 41293	2024-10531	
612	10751	National Fallen Firefighters Memorial Weekend, 2024	May 3, 2024	May 13, 2024	89 FR 41295	2024-10532	
613	10752	Missing or Murdered Indigenous Persons Awareness Day, 2024	May 3, 2024	May 13, 2024	89 FR 41297	2024-10533	
614	10753	Military Spouse Appreciation Day, 2024	May 9, 2024	May 14, 2024	89 FR 41881	2024-10639	
615	10754	National Defense Transportation Day and National Transportation Week, 2024	May 10, 2024	May 15, 2024	89 FR 42329	2024-10757	
616	10755	Peace Officers Memorial Day and Police Week, 2024	May 10, 2024	May 15, 2024	89 FR 42333	2024-10764	
617	10756	National Women's Health Week, 2024	May 10, 2024	May 15, 2024	89 FR 42335	2024-10765	
618	10757	Mother's Day, 2024	May 10, 2024	May 15, 2024	89 FR 42339	2024-10766	
619	10758	70th Anniversary of Brown v. Board of Education	May 16, 2024	May 21, 2024	89 FR 44545	2024-11260	
620	10759	National Safe Boating Week, 2024	May 17, 2024	May 22, 2024	89 FR 44901	2024-11385	
621	10760	National Emergency Medical Services Week, 2024	May 17, 2024	May 22, 2024	89 FR 44903	2024-11387	
622	10761	World Trade Week, 2024	May 17, 2024	May 22, 2024	89 FR 44905	2024-11389	
623	10762	Armed Forces Day, 2024	May 17, 2024	May 22, 2024	89 FR 44907	2024-11390	
624	10763	National Hepatitis Testing Day, 2024	May 17, 2024	May 22, 2024	89 FR 44909	2024-11395	
625	10764	National Maritime Day, 2024	May 21, 2024	May 24, 2024	89 FR 45749	2024-11641	
626	10765	Prayer for Peace, Memorial Day, 2024	May 24, 2024	May 31, 2024	89 FR 47065	2024-12101	
627	10766	Black Music Month, 2024	May 31, 2024	June 5, 2024	89 FR 48223	2024-12477	
628	10767	Lesbian, Gay, Bisexual, Transgender, Queer, and Intersex Pride Month, 2024	May 31, 2024	June 5, 2024	89 FR 48225	2024-12482	
629	10768	National Caribbean American Heritage Month, 2024	May 31, 2024	June 5, 2024	89 FR 48227	2024-12484	
630	10769	National Homeownership Month, 2024	May 31, 2024	June 5, 2024	89 FR 48229	2024-12485	
631	10770	National Ocean Month, 2024	May 31, 2024	June 5, 2024	89 FR 48231	2024-12494	
632	10771	Adjusting Imports of Steel Into the United States	May 31, 2024	June 5, 2024	89 FR 48233	2024-12503	
633	10772	Immigrant Heritage Month, 2024	May 31, 2024	June 6, 2024	89 FR 48255	2024-12540	
634	10773	Securing the Border	June 4, 2024	June 7, 2024	89 FR 48487	2024-12647	
635	10774	National Day of Remembrance of the 80th Anniversary of D-Day	June 5, 2024	June 11, 2024	89 FR 49081	2024-12862	
636	10775	Flag Day and National Flag Week, 2024	June 7, 2024	June 12, 2024	89 FR 50203	2024-13122	
637	10776	World Elder Abuse Awareness Day, 2024	June 14, 2024	June 20, 2024	89 FR 51785	2024-13667	
638	10777	Father's Day, 2024	June 14, 2024	June 20, 2024	89 FR 51787	2024-13670	
639	10778	Juneteenth Day of Observance, 2024	June 18, 2024	June 24, 2024	89 FR 52997	2024-13963	
640	10779	To Further Facilitate Positive Adjustment to Competition From Imports of Certain Crystalline Silicon Photovoltaic Cells (Whether or Not Partially or Fully Assembled Into Other Products)	June 21, 2024	June 26, 2024	89 FR 53333	2024-14143	
641	10780	Granting Pardon for Certain Violations of Article 125 Under the Uniform Code of Military Justice	June 26, 2024	July 1, 2024	89 FR 54329	2024-14584	
642	10781	60th Anniversary of the Civil Rights Act	July 1, 2024	July 8, 2024	89 FR 55883	2024-15027	
643	10782	Adjusting Imports of Aluminum Into the United States	July 10, 2024	July 15, 2024	89 FR 57339	2024-15632	
644	10783	Adjusting Imports of Steel Into the United States	July 10, 2024	July 15, 2024	89 FR 57347	2024-15641	
645	10784	National Atomic Veterans Day, 2024	July 15, 2024	July 19, 2024	89 FR 58619	2024-16056	
646	10785	Captive Nations Week, 2024	July 19, 2024	July 24, 2024	89 FR 59813	2024-16399	
647	10786	Made in America Week, 2024	July 19, 2024	July 24, 2024	89 FR 59815	2024-16400	
648	10787	Anniversary of the Americans With Disabilities Act, 2024	July 25, 2024	July 30, 2024	89 FR 61005	2024-16851	
649	10788	National Korean War Veterans Armistice Day, 2024	July 25, 2024	July 30, 2024	89 FR 61009	2024-16852	
650	10789	National Health Center Week, 2024	August 2, 2024	August 8, 2024	89 FR 64779	2024-17775	
651	10790	To Further Facilitate Positive Adjustment to Competition From Imports of Certain Crystalline Silicon Photovoltaic Cells (Whether or Not Partially or Fully Assembled Into Other Products)	August 12, 2024	August 15, 2024	89 FR 66181	2024-18444	
652	10791	National Employer Support of the Guard and Reserve Week, 2024	August 16, 2024	August 21, 2024	89 FR 67517	2024-18875	
653	10792	Establishment of the Springfield 1908 Race Riot National Monument	August 16, 2024	August 22, 2024	89 FR 67821	2024-18999	
654	10793	Overdose Awareness Week, 2024	August 23, 2024	August 28, 2024	89 FR 68769	2024-19441	
655	10794	Women's Equality Day, 2024	August 23, 2024	August 28, 2024	89 FR 68773	2024-19444	
656	10795	National Childhood Cancer Awareness Month, 2024	August 30, 2024	September 5, 2024	89 FR 72279	2024-20121	
657	10796	National Ovarian Cancer Awareness Month, 2024	August 30, 2024	September 5, 2024	89 FR 72283	2024-20122	
658	10797	National Preparedness Month, 2024	August 30, 2024	September 5, 2024	89 FR 72285	2024-20123	
659	10798	National Prostate Cancer Awareness Month, 2024	August 30, 2024	September 5, 2024	89 FR 72287	2024-20124	
660	10799	National Recovery Month, 2024	August 30, 2024	September 5, 2024	89 FR 72289	2024-20126	
661	10800	National Sickle Cell Awareness Month, 2024	August 30, 2024	September 5, 2024	89 FR 72291	2024-20129	
719	10858	America Recycles Day, 2024	November 14, 2024	November 19, 2024	89 FR 91523	2024-27258	
720	10859	American Education Week, 2024	November 15, 2024	November 20, 2024	89 FR 91525	2024-27304	
721	10860	National Apprenticeship Week, 2024	November 15, 2024	November 20, 2024	89 FR 91527	2024-27307	
722	10861	International Conservation Day, 2024	November 17, 2024	November 26, 2024	89 FR 93141	2024-27849	
723	10862	National Child's Day, 2024	November 19, 2024	November 27, 2024	89 FR 93461	2024-28062	
724	10863	National Rural Health Day, 2024	November 20, 2024	November 29, 2024	89 FR 94595	2024-28225	
725	10864	National Family Week	November 22, 2024	December 2, 2024	89 FR 95077	2024-28331	
726	10865	Thanksgiving Day, 2024	November 27, 2024	December 3, 2024	89 FR 96087	2024-28461	
727	10866	Nation Impaired Driving Month, 2024	November 29, 2024	December 5, 2024	89 FR 96513	2024-28713	
728	10867	World AIDS Day, 2024	November 29, 2024	December 5, 2024	89 FR 96515	2024-28714	
729	10868	International Day of Persons With Disabilities, 2024	December 3, 2024	December 6, 2024	89 FR 96855	2024-28852	
730	10869	National Pearl Harbor Remembrance Day, 2024	December 6, 2024	December 11, 2024	89 FR 99693	2024-29337	
731	10870	Establishment of the Carlisle Federal Indian Boarding School National Monument	December 9, 2024	December 12, 2024	89 FR 100289	2024-29459	
732	10871	Human Rights Day and Human Rights Week, 2024	December 9, 2024	December 12, 2024	89 FR 100299	2024-29460	
733	10872	Bill of Rights Day, 2024	December 13, 2024	December 18, 2024	89 FR 102673	2024-30300	
734	10873	Establishment of the Frances Perkins National Monument	December 16, 2024	December 19, 2024	89 FR 103617	2024-30485	
735	10874	Wright Brothers Day, 2024	December 16, 2024	December 19, 2024	89 FR 103625	2024-30486	
736	10875	To Implement the United States-Israel Agreement on Trade in Agricultural Products and for Other Purposes	December 20, 2024	December 27, 2024	89 FR 105333	2024-31353	
737	10876	Announcing the Death of James Earl Carter Jr.	December 29, 2024	January 3, 2025	90 FR 185	2024-31762	
738	10877	National Human Trafficking Prevention Month, 2025	December 30, 2024	January 6, 2025	90 FR 529	2025-00078	
739	10878	National Mentoring Month, 2025	December 31, 2024	January 7, 2025	90 FR 1025	2025-00227	
740	10879	National Stalking Awareness Month, 2025	December 31, 2024	January 7, 2025	90 FR 1027	2025-00228	

=== 2025 ===
Relative no.	Absolute no.	Title / description	Date signed	Date published	FR citation	FR doc. number	Ref.
741	10880	Amending Proclamation 8336 To Read, "Establishment of the Pacific Islands Heritage Marine National Monument" and Amending Proclamation 9173 To Read, "Pacific Islands Heritage Marine National Monument Expansion"	January 2, 2025	January 13, 2025	90 FR 2575	2025-00649	
742	10881	Establishment of the Chuckwalla National Monument	January 14, 2025	January 17, 2025	90 FR 6715	2025-01441	
743	10882	Establishment of the Sáttítla Highlands National Monument	January 14, 2025	January 17, 2025	90 FR 6727	2025-01443	
744	10883	Religious Freedom Day, 2025	January 15, 2025	January 17, 2025	90 FR 6747	2025-01465	
745	10884	Martin Luther King Jr., Federal Holiday, 2025	January 17, 2025	January 22, 2025	90 FR 7649	2025-01600	
