= Rex 84 =

Plan by the U.S. to detain American residents

Rex 84B, short for Readiness Exercise 1984 Bravo, was a classified scenario and drill developed by the United States federal government to detain large numbers of United States residents deemed to be "national security threats" in the event that the president declared a National Emergency. The scenario envisioned state defense forces rounding up to 500,000 undocumented Central American residents and 4,000 American citizens whom the US Attorney General had designated as "national security threats" as part of the secret Continuity of Government program. These people would be detained at 22 military bases in prison camps run by the Federal Emergency Management Agency.

The plan was first discovered by the Christic Institute in 1984 and first revealed in detail in a major daily newspaper by reporter Alfonso Chardy in the July 5, 1987 edition of the Miami Herald. The possible reasons for such a roundup were reported to be widespread opposition to a U.S. military invasion abroad, such as if the United States were to directly invade Central America. To combat what the government perceived as "subversive activities", the plan also authorized the military to direct the movement of civilian populations at state and regional levels, according to Professor Diana Reynolds.

== Background ==
The existence of master military contingency plans (of which Rex 84 was a part), Operation Garden Plot and a similar earlier exercise, Lantern Spike, were originally revealed by journalist Ron Ridenhour, who summarized his findings in a 1975 article in CounterSpy magazine. Starting in 1981, the DoD and FEMA began a tradition of bi-annual joint exercises to test civil mobilization using the names Proud Saber and Rex 82. In 1984, the scenario involved a US Army rehearsal of airlifting the entire 82nd Airborne Division (consisting of 15,000 troops) from Fort Bragg in North Carolina, under the cover of night and flying them to either El Salvador or Nicaragua as a simulated invasion to enforce a state of martial law. This part of the exercise had been code named Rex 84 Night Train, and the overall readiness exercise, involving 34 federal agencies, was code named Rex 84, with FEMA's role in assisting the DoD as Rex 84 Alpha. Later, when the mass detention scenario involving FEMA was added at the request of FEMA director Louis Giuffrida and Reagan Advisor Edwin Meese and personally authorized by President Ronald Reagan, the mass detention scenario was code named Rex 84 Bravo. It was modeled on a 1970s Giuffreda-Meese-Reagan exercise in California known as Operation Cable Splicer.

The plan was first discovered by the Christic Institute in 1984 and first revealed in detail in a major daily newspaper by reporter Alfonso Chardy in the July 5, 1987 edition of the Miami Herald. The possible reasons for such a roundup were reported to be widespread opposition to a U.S. military invasion abroad, such as if the United States were to directly invade Central America. To combat what the government perceived as "subversive activities", the plan also authorized the military to direct the movement of civilian populations at state and regional levels, according to Professor Diana Reynolds.

== Role in Iran-Contra ==
The FEMA role in Rex 84, branded Rex 84B, was brainstormed by Louis Giuffrida as a way to ship arms to the Contras, in violation of the Boland Amendment, a potentially impeachable offense. The states of Texas, Alabama, and Louisiana had established civilian "state defense forces" independent of the national guard, recruiting mercenaries through the magazine Soldier of Fortune. This allowed FEMA to sidestep its own and Department of Defense procurement rules for the weapons needed for mass detentions and sidestepped the Posse Comitatus Act, which prohibits deploying US military forces in the United States to enforce civilian laws against civilians. The Pentagon shipped the state security forces massive amounts of arms and military equipment for the exercise, and the defense forces were instructed to re-value the equipment at its higher replacement value. At the end of the exercise, the security forces only returned equipment at the value originally shipped, leaving surplus military equipment in the hands of civilians. These weapons were then "donated" to Central Intelligence Agency front-charities and shipped to the Contras in Central America under the cover of humanitarian supplies.

== Continuity of Government ==
Transcripts from the Iran–Contra hearings on July 13, 1987, record the following dialogue between Congressman Jack Brooks, Oliver North's attorney Brendan Sullivan, and Senator Daniel Inouye, the Democratic Chair of the joint Senate–House Committee:

[Congressman Jack] Brooks: Colonel North, in your work at the N.S.C. were you not assigned, at one time, to work on plans for the continuity of government in the event of a major disaster?

Brendan Sullivan [North's counsel, agitatedly]: Mr. Chairman?

[Senator Daniel] Inouye: I believe that question touches upon a highly sensitive and classified area so may I request that you not touch upon that?

Brooks: I was particularly concerned, Mr. Chairman, because I read in Miami papers, and several others, that there had been a plan developed, by that same agency, a contingency plan in the event of emergency, that would suspend the American constitution. And I was deeply concerned about it and wondered if that was an area in which he had worked. I believe that it was and I wanted to get his confirmation.

Inouye: May I most respectfully request that that matter not be touched upon at this stage. If we wish to get into this, I'm certain arrangements can be made for an executive session.

Contingency plans by the US Government for rounding up people perceived by the government to be subversive or a threat to civil order have existed for many decades. For example, from 1967 to 1971, the FBI kept a list of over 100,000 people to be rounded up as subversive, dubbed the "ADEX" list. Such a list existed in 1984 as part of the classified Continuity of Government program; however, when Giuffreda asked Attorney General William French Smith to release the list to FEMA for the exercise, the Attorney General refused.

AG French's concerns about FEMA's role in Rex 84B led to several reforms. It emerged FEMA's Director of Civil Security had compiled a list of 12,000 names of political security threats, intruding on the FBI's jurisdiction. While FEMA spent resources building civil security infrastructure such as detention camp supplies, it neglected its basic civil defense role. Giuffreda resigned in 1985 after a US House of Representatives subcommittee charged that FEMA was being mismanaged. A secret DoD/CIA joint investigation into the potential unconstitutionality of FEMA's role in planning for civil security emergencies (i.e. martial law) unearthed the Rex 84B plan and exercise data; however, this was destroyed by the investigator, CIA agent William Buckley, who would later be kidnapped and murdered while serving as Beirut station chief in 1985 by the Islamic Jihad Organization.

== Modern and future sites ==
As of January 2026 there is potential for a federal detention facility to be installed at a Rex 84 site in Kansas City, Missouri. The Richards-Gebaur Memorial Airport now redeveloped for private industrial and logistics business is being evaluated by the United States Immigration and Customs Enforcement (ICE) for the construction of such a facility.

== Legacy ==
Rex 84B's scenario of mass detention of US citizens and residents under an unrealistic pretext and without congressional debate is often cited by civil libertarians opposing the militarization of police, and has also given rise to the FEMA camps conspiracy theory. The existence of the ADEX list presaged mass restrictions on movement without due process such as the no-fly list. The exercise's fictional scenario of viewing Central American refugees as potential subversives who might organize themselves into terrorist cells was sent to the FBI as fact, leading to a crackdown by border authorities and federal government hostility to the American Sanctuary Movement. In 2003, Congressman Jim McDermott cited Rex 84B in raising concerns about martial law in the United States as part of the Global War on Terror.

== See also ==
- COINTELPRO
- FEMA camps conspiracy theory
- Huston Plan
- Main Core
- Mariel boatlift
- No Fly List
- Non-Detention Act
- NSPD-51
- Palmer Raids
- Posse Comitatus Act
- Terrorist Screening Database
- Violent Radicalization and Homegrown Terrorism Prevention Act of 2007
