= PDD-62 =

Presidential decision aimed at combating terrorism

Presidential Decision Directive 62 (PDD-62), titled Combating Terrorism, was a Presidential Decision Directive (PDD), signed on May 22, 1998 by President Bill Clinton. It identified the fight against terrorism a top national security priority.

== Background ==
During his administration, President Clinton worked to deepen cooperation with U.S. allies, strengthen law enforcement counter-terrorism tools and improve airplane and airport security. Before September 11, 2001, these efforts had paid off by foiling major terrorist plots and apprehending, trying and sentencing terrorists.

Due to America's military strength and superiority, potential enemies are more likely to attack through means of terror instead of conventional military assault. Easier access to sophisticated technology means that the destructive power available to terrorists is greater than ever. Terrorists could potentially use weapons of mass destruction to cause physical destruction or advanced computer technology to attack our economy and critical infrastructure.

Presidential Decision Directive 62 addresses these challenges by creating a new and more systematic approach to fighting the terrorist threat of the next century. It reinforces the mission of the many U.S. agencies charged with roles in defeating terrorism; it also codifies and clarifies their activities in the wide range of U.S. counter-terrorism programs, from apprehension and prosecution of terrorists to increasing transportation security, enhancing response capabilities and protecting the computer-based systems that lie at the heart of America's economy.

PDD-62 is a classified document. It is meant to reaffirm PDD-39, "United States Policy on Counterterrorism." As such, the Federal Bureau of Investigation (FBI) will continue to serve as the Lead Federal Agency for "crisis management" and the Federal Emergency Management Agency (FEMA) will continue to serve as the Lead Federal Agency for "consequence management."

=== PDD-39 ===
Presidential Decision Directive 39 (PDD-39), U.S. Policy on Counterterrorism, was signed on June 21, 1995 by President Clinton. It defines policies regarding the federal response to threats or acts of terrorism involving nuclear, biological, or chemical materials or weapons of mass destruction (NBC/WMD).

Section 3 states: "We shall have the ability to respond rapidly and decisively to terrorism directed against us wherever it occurs, to protect Americans, arrest or defeat the perpetrators, respond with all appropriate instruments against the sponsoring organizations and governments and provide recovery relief to victims, as permitted by law."

Since the official document is classified, a fact sheet on Presidential Decision Directive 62 was released by the White House in May 1998 listing the following details of the directive.

=== Outline ===
==== General ====
It is increasingly likely that terrorist groups, or individuals with criminal intent, may use unconventional methods to disrupt the Nation's critical infrastructure or use weapons of mass destruction (WMD) against Americans.

As these types of threats mature, it is necessary to prepare to deter them, prevent them from occurring, or, if need be, limit the damage to a minimum. Success is dependent upon possessing the capability for an integrated response, and in the case of critical infrastructure protection, having public/private partnerships.

==== Present achievements and current challenges ====
Present achievements
- An increased rate of apprehensions and convictions;
- An increase in counterterrorism legislative authorities;
- An increase in the funding for consequence management planning;
- An increase in the importance of terrorism on the diplomatic agenda;
- Growth of assistance to, and cooperation with, other democracies in combating terrorism; and
- Improving and expanding a professionally trained interagency cadre.

Current challenges
- Terrorist groups may choose asymmetrical attacks on our domestic and international vulnerabilities, through the use of WMD and/or cyber warfare;
- Terrorist groups possess the knowledge, skills, and abilities to use WMD;
- Former "cold war" civil defense programs have been downsized or dismantled, and cities are not prepared to deal with a large-scale event;
- Improvements in technology will make it difficult for law enforcement agencies to detect and prevent terrorist acts; and
- The Nation's critical infrastructure relies heavily on the use of computers, which are prone to cyber attacks.

==== Consequences management ====
In the event of a terrorism incident, the Federal Government will respond rapidly, working with State and local governments, to restore order and deliver emergency assistance. FEMA, the Lead Federal Agency for consequence management, is responsible for preparing for and responding to the consequences of a WMD incident with participation of other departments and agencies including the Public Health Service (PHS), Environmental Protection Agency (EPA), and Department of Energy (DOE]), as necessary. The Department of Justice (DOJ), through the FBI, is the Lead Federal Agency for crisis management and operational response to a weapon of mass destruction incident.

Domestically, key Federal agencies and Departments, through interagency efforts, will continue training and providing equipment to first responders to prepare them for response to WMD incidents. Emphasis will be placed on preparing those responders in the largest 120 cities.

The Department of Defense, in coordination with other Federal Departments and agencies, will provide training to metropolitan first responders and will maintain trained military units to assist State and local responders. One example is the US National Guard concept of initially forming 10 Rapid Assessment and Initial Detection (RAID) teams in each FEMA Region. These teams are designed to provide rapid response to a WMD incident and assist State and local responders.

PHS, in the Department of Health and Human Services, is the Lead Federal Agency in planning and preparing for response to WMD-related medical emergencies. PHS will continue supporting State and local governments in developing Metropolitan Medical Strike Teams; maintaining the National Disaster Medical System; and, in conjunction with the Department of Veterans Affairs, stockpiling antidotes and pharmaceuticals in the event of a WMD incident.

==== Equipment ====
DOJ, in coordination with FEMA, will provide equipment to State and local emergency responders.

==== Critical infrastructure ====
It is imperative that the United States be adequately prepared to deal with attacks on critical infrastructure and cyber systems. As such, the President reviewed the recommendations of the Presidential Commission on Critical Infrastructure Protection and has signed PDD-63, entitled Protecting America's Critical Infrastructures (PDD-63 is For Official Use Only). A white paper, entitled "The Clinton Administration's Policy on Critical Infrastructure Protection: Presidential Decision Directive-63," is available at www.whitehouse.gov/WH/EOP/NSC/htm/NSCSDoo3.html. This white paper outlines the Administration's program to deal with threats to our Nation's critical infrastructure.

=== National coordinator ===
PDD-62 also establishes the office of the National Coordinator for Security, Infrastructure Protection and Counter-Terrorism. The National Coordinator oversees the broad variety of relevant policies and programs including areas such as counter-terrorism, protection of critical infrastructure, preparedness and consequence management for weapons of mass destruction. The National Coordinator works within the National Security Council, reports to the President through the Assistant to the President for National Security Affairs (the National Security Advisor) and produces for him an annual Security Preparedness Report. The National Coordinator also provides advice regarding budgets for counter-terror programs and coordinates the development of guidelines that might be needed for crisis management.

== See also ==
- National Special Security Event (Presidential Decision Directive 62)
- Critical Infrastructure Protection (Presidential Decision Directive 63)
