= United States federal government continuity of operations =

Continuity of Operations (COOP) is a United States federal government initiative, established and governed by U.S. Presidential Policy Directive 40 (PPD-40), to ensure that agencies can continue the performance of essential functions under a broad range of circumstances. PPD-40 specifies particular requirements for continuity plan development, including the requirement that all federal executive branch departments and agencies develop an integrated, overlapping continuity capability that ensures the continuous performance of the eight National Essential Functions (NEFs).

The Federal Emergency Management Agency provides guidance to the private sector for business continuity planning. A continuity plan is essential to help identify critical functions and develop preventive measures to continue important functions should a disruption occur.

== History ==
A Continuity of Operations Plan (or Continuity of Government Plan) has been a part of U.S. government operations since President Dwight D. Eisenhower provided (via executive order) various measures designed to ensure that the government of the United States would be able to continue operating after a nuclear war.

These measures included construction of underground facilities such as "Mount Weather", a putatively nuclear-weapon-proof facility in a hollowed-out mountain in northeastern Virginia; and Raven Rock Mountain Complex near Camp David in Maryland. The public can now tour one such facility, intended to house the entire United States Congress, on the grounds of the Greenbrier Resort in White Sulphur Springs, West Virginia. Other provisions of the plans included executive orders designating certain government officials to assume Cabinet and other executive-branch positions and carry out the position's responsibilities if the primary officeholders are killed.

There has been a formal line of succession to the presidency since 1792 (currently found in the Presidential Succession Act of 1947, 3 U.S.C. § 19). This runs from the Vice President to the Speaker of the House of Representatives, President pro tempore of the Senate, and then through the Cabinet secretaries in a sequence specified by Congress.

Continuity of government plans are not limited to the federal government. The majority of states have constitutional provisions that provide for the succession of government in the event of an "enemy attack".

== Continuity of Operations plan activated ==
The George W. Bush administration put the Continuity of Operations plan into effect for the first time directly following the September 11 attacks. Their implementation involved a rotating staff of 75 to 150 senior officials and other government workers from every federal executive department and other parts of the executive branch in two secure bunkers on the East Coast. Friends, family, and co-workers could reach them only through a toll-free number and personal extensions. The Bush administration did not acknowledge the implementation of the COG plan until March 1, 2002.

In 2007, Larry Sabato, a professor at the University of Virginia, criticized the incomplete nature of the plan in his book A More Perfect Constitution. In particular, he objected to the fact that there is no constitutional procedure for replacing U.S. House members in the case of a large-scale disaster that could potentially kill many representatives. Regarding the Continuity of Operations Plan, Sabato said it "failed outright" during the September 11 attacks.

== Lack of congressional oversight ==
On July 18, 2007, Rep. Peter DeFazio (D-OR), a member of the U.S. House Committee on Homeland Security at that time, requested the classified and more detailed version of the government's continuity-of-operations plan in a letter signed by him and the chairperson of the House Homeland Security Committee, which is supposed to have access to confidential government information.

To the surprise of the congressional committee, the president refused to provide the information. As of August 2007, efforts by the committee to secure a copy of the plan continued.

== Documents ==
A document named in italics supersedes a previously published document.

Federal Continuity Directive 1 (FCD 1) is a 2017 directive released by the Department of Homeland Security (DHS) that provides doctrine and guidance to all federal organizations regarding the development of continuity program plans and capabilities. FCD 1 also serves as guidance to state, local, and tribal governments.

The Federal Continuity Directive 2 (FCD 2) of June 2017 is a directive to assist federal Executive Branch organizations in identifying their Mission Essential Functions (MEFs) and candidate Primary Mission Essential Functions (PMEFs).

In July 2013, the DHS, together with the Federal Emergency Management Agency (FEMA), and in coordination with other non-federal partners, developed the Continuity Guidance Circular 1 (CGC 1) and CGC 2.

The preamble of the CGC 1 states that its function is to provide "direction to the non-Federal Governments (NFGs) for developing continuity plans and programs. Continuity planning facilitates the performance of essential functions during all-hazards emergencies or other situations that may disrupt normal operations. By continuing the performance of essential functions through a catastrophic emergency, the State, territorial, tribal, and local governments, and the private sector support the ability of the Federal Government to perform National Essential Functions (NEFs)."

CGC 1 closely parallels the information in FCD 1 but is geared toward states, territories, tribal and local governments, and private-sector organizations.

The purpose of Continuity Guidance Circular 2 (CGC 2) is to provide "non-Federal Governments (NFGs) with guidance on how to implement CGC 1, Annex D: ESSENTIAL FUNCTIONS. It provides them with guidance, a methodology, and checklists to identify, assess, and validate their essential functions. This CGC includes guidance for conducting a continuity Business Process Analysis (BPA), Business Impact Analysis (BIA), and a risk assessment that will identify essential function relationships, interdependencies, time sensitivities, threats and vulnerabilities, and mitigation strategies."

=== Truman administration ===
- National Security Act of 1947, July 26, 1947

=== Eisenhower administration ===
- Eisenhower Ten, March 6, 1958

=== Carter administration ===
- Executive Order 12148, "Federal Emergency Management", July 20, 1979

=== Reagan administration ===
An unknown contingency plan (which some believe was Rex 84) was publicly mentioned during the Iran-Contra Hearings in 1987. Transcripts from the hearing in the New York Times record the following dialogue between Congressman Jack Brooks, Oliver North's attorney Brendan Sullivan and Senator Daniel Inouye, the Democratic Chair of the Committee:

[Congressman Jack] Brooks: Colonel North, in your work at the N.S.C. were you not assigned, at one time, to work on plans for the continuity of government in the event of a major disaster?

Brendan Sullivan [North's counsel, agitatedly]: Mr. Chairman?

[Senator Daniel] Inouye: I believe that question touches upon a highly sensitive and classified area, so may I request that you not touch upon that?

Brooks: I was particularly concerned, Mr. Chairman, because I read in Miami papers, and several others, that there had been a plan developed, by that same agency, a contingency plan in the event of emergency, that would suspend the American constitution. And I was deeply concerned about it and wondered if that was an area in which he had worked. I believe that it was, and I wanted to get his confirmation.

Inouye: May I most respectfully request that that matter not be touched upon at this stage. If we wish to get into this, I'm certain arrangements can be made for an executive session.

- Executive Order 12656, "Assignment of Emergency Preparedness Responsibilities", November 18, 1988

Section 202

The head of each Federal department and agency shall ensure the continuity of essential functions in any national security emergency by providing for: succession to office and emergency delegation of authority in accordance with applicable law; safekeeping of essential resources, facilities, and records; and establishment of emergency operating capabilities.

- Executive Order 12472, "Assignment of National Security and Emergency Preparedness Telecommunications Functions", April 3, 1984
- NSD 69 NSDD 55, "Enduring National Leadership" September 14, 1982

=== George H. W. Bush administration ===
- PDD 67 National Security Directive 69, "Enduring Constitutional Government", June 2, 1992
- FPC 65 Federal Preparedness Circular 61, "Emergency Succession to Key Positions of the Federal Departments and Agencies", August 2, 1991
- FPC 65 Federal Preparedness Circular 62, "Delegation of Authorities for Emergency Situations", August 1, 1991
- Federal Preparedness Circular 60, "Continuity of the Executive Branch of the Federal Government at the Headquarters Level During National Security Emergencies", November 20, 1990
- NSD 69 National Security Directive 37, "Enduring Constitutional Government", April 18, 1990

=== Clinton administration ===
- Federal Preparedness Circular 65, "Federal Executive Branch Continuity of Operations (COOP)", July 26, 1999
- "Federal Response Plan" [FEMA 9230.1-PL], April 1999
- Presidential Decision Directive 67, "Enduring Constitutional Government and Continuity of Government Operations", October 21, 1998
- 41 Code of Federal Regulations 101-2, "Occupant Emergency Program", revised as of July 1, 1998
- 36 Code of Federal Regulations 1236, "Management of Vital Records", revised as of July 1, 1998
- Presidential Decision Directive 63, "Critical Infrastructure Protection (CIP)", May 22, 1998
- Presidential Decision Directive 62, "Protection Against Unconventional Threats to the Homeland and Americans Overseas", May 22, 1998
- FPC 65 Federal Response Planning Guidance 01-94, "Continuity of Operations (COOP)", December 4, 1994

=== George W. Bush administration ===
- NSPD 51 National Security Presidential Directive 51, "National Continuity Policy", May 9, 2007 (supersedes Presidential Decision Directive 67) (also known as HSPD 20 "Homeland Security Presidential Directive 20")

== Hardware and facilities ==
The Continuity of Operations Plan involves numerous bunkers, special airplanes, and communication systems. Much of the information about them is classified; however, the government has released information on various systems or described them to the public by reporters and writers. Since many of the details are classified, the public information may be incorrect. Also, they are subject to change without public notice, so this list may not reflect current plans.

=== Facilities ===
During the Cold War, the United States constructed bunkers to help military command and government officials survive. Some have been decommissioned since then, but the ones that are still considered to be in operation are listed here.

The United States Congress was formerly housed in the Greenbrier Bunker, but since it was discovered in the early 1990s, the new location of the Congressional bunker is unknown.

- Cheyenne Mountain Complex - This underground facility is the former home of NORAD. Becoming fully operational on April 20, 1966, it is located in Colorado Springs, Colorado. Currently, the military has the goal of placing the operations center on "warm stand-by", meaning that the facility will be maintained and ready for use on short notice as necessary, but not used on a daily basis. In the event of an emergency deemed serious enough, NORAD and USNORTHCOM would use the bunker for C4ISTAR (command and control) of the United States military.
- Site R (Raven Rock) - Near Waynesboro, Pennsylvania, Site R is the emergency home for the Pentagon. Vice President Cheney is reported to have stayed there after the September 11 attacks.
- Mount Weather - The Mount Weather Emergency Operations Center is a government facility located near Bluemont, Virginia. It houses operations and training facilities above ground for the Federal Emergency Management Agency (FEMA). It contains an underground facility designed to house key components of the American government in the case of nuclear war.

=== Airplanes ===
- Air Force One is the radio call sign of any Air Force plane the President of the United States travels on. However, the term typically refers to a Boeing VC-25A, which the president typically uses. While the VC-25A is equipped with numerous systems to ensure its survival, in an emergency, it is recommended that the president use the National Airborne Operations Center.
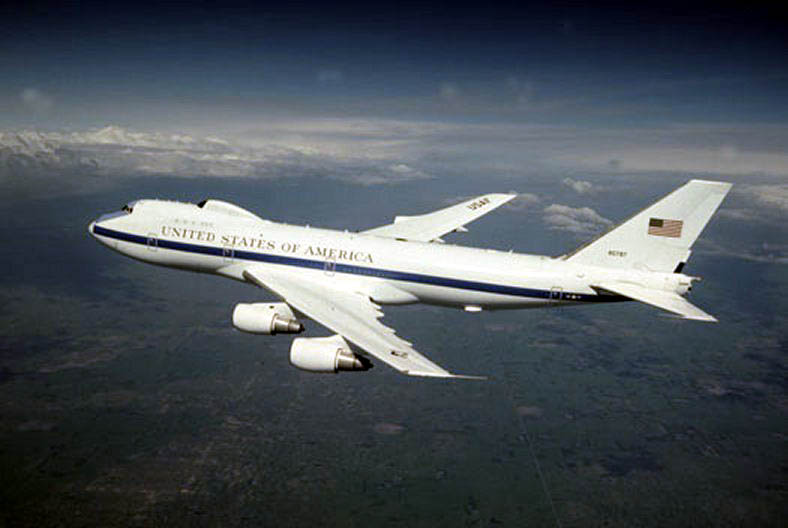
- "Nightwatch" in flight
  National Airborne Operations Center (codenamed Nightwatch) is a Boeing E-4 specially built to serve as a survivable mobile command post for the National Command Authority (NCA). The president or the secretary of Defense may use it. It is also possible that the president would authorize the vice president or others to use it, depending on the circumstances.
- Looking Glass is United States Strategic Command's Airborne Command Post, designed to take over in case U.S. Strategic Command is destroyed or incapable of communicating with strategic forces. Beginning February 3, 1961, an Air Force Looking Glass aircraft was in the air at all times, 24 hours a day, 365 days a year. On July 24, 1990, Looking Glass ceased continuous airborne alert but remained on ground or airborne alert 24 hours a day. On October 1, 1998, the U.S. Navy replaced the U.S. Air Force in this duty. In addition, a battle staff now flies with the TACAMO crew.

=== Ships ===
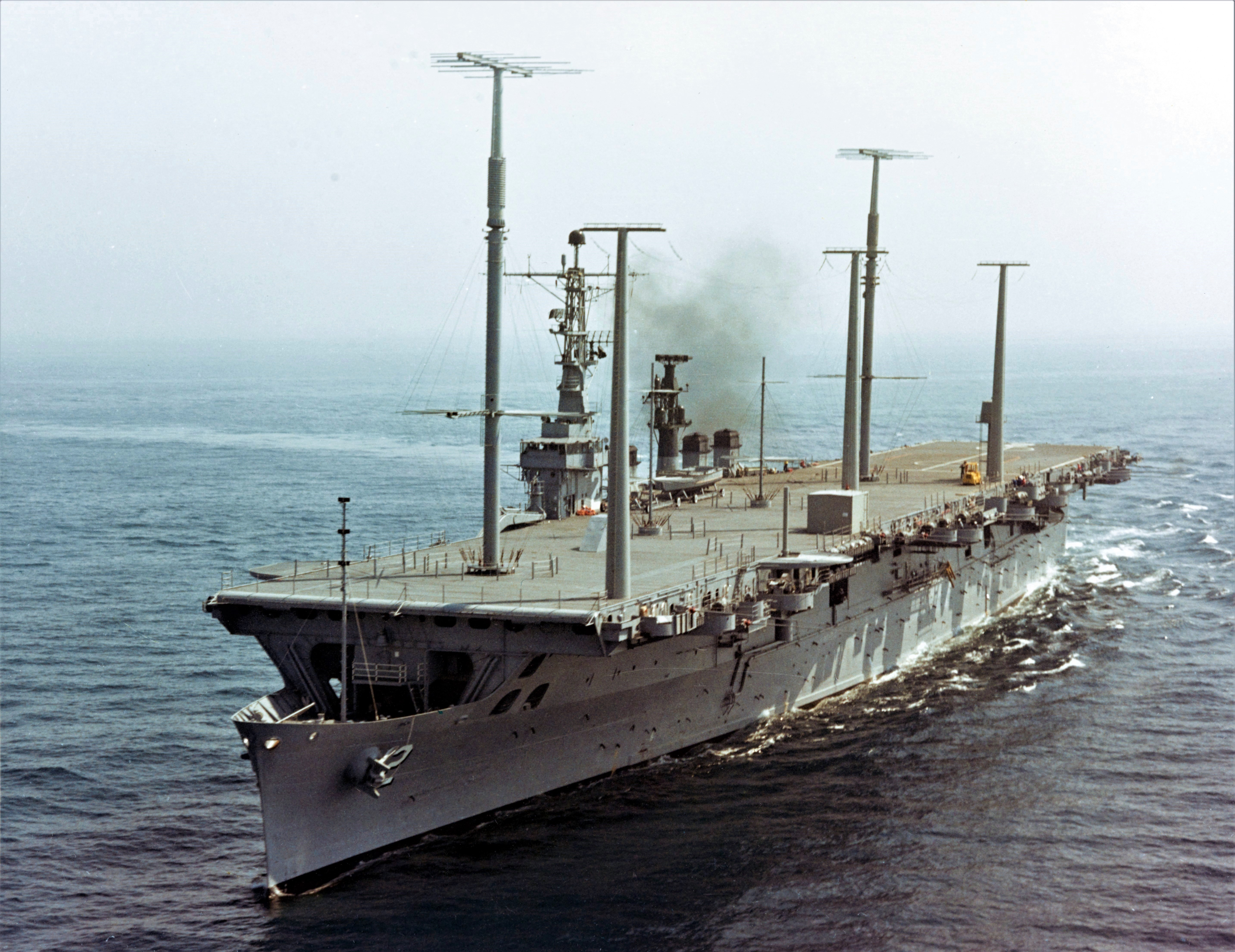
The USS Wright (CC-2)

Two National Emergency Command Posts Afloat were:

- USS Northampton was converted into Command Ship CC-1 about 1962.
- USS Wright was converted into Command Ship CC-2 between 1962 and 1963, including the National Military Command System.

These vessels were decommissioned in 1970.

=== Communication ===
The Defense Communication Agency was tasked in 1963 with maintaining an active backup of all communications for any event that could disrupt communications and the management of command and control communications systems, as the National Communications System. This mission was partially transferred to Defense Information Systems Agency, in charge of supporting command, control, communications, and information systems for the military in the 1990s. It would support the National Command Authority. These functions were later transferred to Joint Forces Command and STRATCOM, but the backup contingency systems continue to operate. It is assumed that the various bunkers and airplanes have been equipped with special communication equipment to survive a catastrophe.

- Internet - The Internet began as the ARPANET, a program funded by the U.S. military. The Internet is designed with the capability to withstand losses of large portions of the underlying networks, but was never designed to withstand a nuclear attack. Due to the huge number of people using it would likely be jammed and unable to handle communication if it suffered a large amount of damage. During a localized emergency, it is beneficial. However, losing electrical power to an area can make accessing the Internet difficult or impossible.
- Communications satellites—Basically immune to any ground catastrophe, military communication satellites are expected to provide the government with the ability to communicate in any situation other than one that includes a direct attack upon the satellites.
- AN/URC-117 Ground Wave Emergency Network or GWEN, a retired military command and control communications system
- Post-Attack Command and Control System
- Survivable Low Frequency Communications System

== See also ==
- Business continuity
- Critical infrastructure protection
- Designated survivor
- Disaster recovery
- National Response Framework
- National Security and Homeland Security Presidential Directive
- Presidential directive
- Presidential Emergency Action Documents
