= National security directive =

Classified instructions from the US president

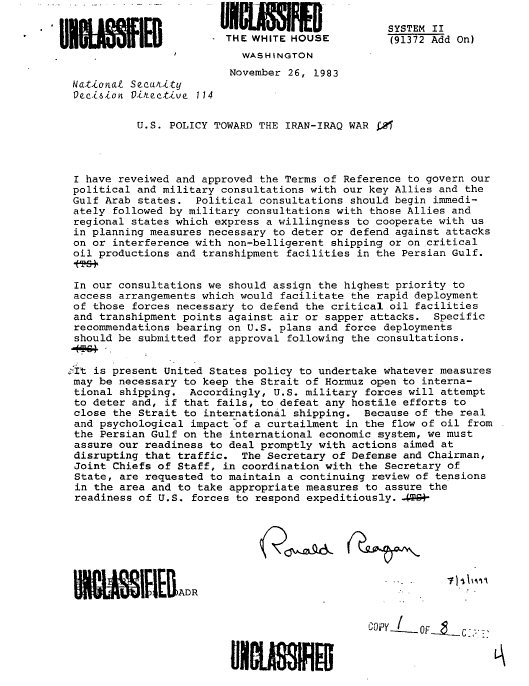
National Security Decision Directive 114, signed by Ronald Reagan

National security directives are presidential directives issued for the National Security Council (NSC). Starting with Harry Truman, every president since the founding of the National Security Council in 1947 has issued national security directives in one form or another, which have involved foreign, military and domestic policies. National security directives are generally highly classified and are available to the public only after "a great many years" have elapsed. Unlike executive orders, national security directives are usually directed only to the National Security Council and the most senior executive branch officials, and embody foreign and military policy-making guidance rather than specific instructions.

== Names for national security directives by administration ==
Presidents have issued such directives under various names.

Initials	Full title	Time frame	Presidential administration(s)
NSCID	National Security Council Intelligence Directive	1947–1977	Truman–Ford
NSAM	National Security Action Memorandum	1961–1969	Kennedy and Johnson
NSSM	National Security Study Memorandum	1969–1977	Nixon and Ford
NSDM	National Security Decision Memorandum	1969–1977	Nixon and Ford
PRM	Presidential Review Memorandum	1977–1981	Carter
PD	Presidential Directive	1977–1981	Carter
NSSD	National Security Study Directive	1981–1989	Reagan
NSDD	National Security Decision Directive	1981–1989	Reagan
NSR	National Security Review	1989–1993	G. H. W. Bush
NSD	National Security Directive	1989–1993	G. H. W. Bush
PRD	Presidential Review Directive	1993–2001	Clinton
PDD	Presidential Decision Directive	1993–2001	Clinton
NSPD	National Security Presidential Directive	2001–2009	G. W. Bush
PSD	Presidential Study Directive	2009–2017	Obama
PPD	Presidential Policy Directive	2009–2017	Obama
NSPM	National Security Presidential Memorandum	2017–2021; 2025–present	Trump
NSSM	National Security Study Memorandum	2021–2025	Biden
NSM	National Security Memorandum	2021–2025	Biden

=== Truman and Eisenhower administrations ===
National security directives were quite different in the early period of the Cold War. A 1988 General Accounting Office (GAO) investigation into national security directives left out the directives from the Truman and Eisenhower years because "they were not structured in a way to allow categorization." The study nevertheless made note of two types of directives. The first was "policy papers" which could contain policy recommendations, in which case the president might decide to approve the policy by writing his signature. A famous example of such a policy paper is NSC 68. GAO also noted another type of directive called "NSC Actions", which were "numbered records of decisions that were reached at NSC meetings.

=== Kennedy and Johnson administrations ===
The Kennedy administration which took office in 1961 reorganized the NSC and began issuing National Security Action Memoranda (NSAMs). Many NSAMs were signed in Kennedy's name by National Security Advisor McGeorge Bundy, although Kennedy sometimes signed them personally. Lyndon B. Johnson continued issuing NSAMs where Kennedy left off, although issuing only 99 directives as compared to Kennedy's 273.

=== Reagan administration ===
A 1986 National Security Decision Directive gave the State Department authority and responsibility to coordinate responses to international terrorism across government agencies including the CIA, DoD, and FBI. This was intended to reduce interagency conflicts which were observed in the response to the hijacking of the Achille Lauro cruise ship. The State Department's Bureau of Counterterrorism continues this coordinating function.

=== Second Trump administration ===
Under the Trump administration in both terms (2017–2021 & 2025–present), National Security Directives were renamed "National Security Presidential Memoranda", or NSPMs.

On September 25, 2025, Trump issued National Security Presidential Memorandum/NSPM-7, titled "Countering Domestic Terrorism and Organized Political Violence".

== Homeland Security Presidential Directive ==
After September 11, 2001, George W. Bush issued Homeland Security Presidential Directives (HSPDs), with the consent of the Homeland Security Council. These directives were sometimes issued concurrently as national security directives.

== Secrecy ==
Regarding the secrecy of presidential directives, Steven Aftergood of the Federation of American Scientists' Project on Government Secrecy stated in February 2008 that:

Of the 54 National Security Presidential Directives issued by the (George W.) Bush Administration to date, the titles of only about half have been publicly identified. There is descriptive material or actual text in the public domain for only about a third. In other words, there are dozens of undisclosed Presidential directives that define U.S. national security policy and task government agencies, but whose substance is unknown either to the public or, as a rule, to Congress.

However, in an unprecedented development, the first Trump administration ordered their national security directives to be published in the Federal Register.

== See also ==
- Continuity of Operations Plan
- National Security and Homeland Security Presidential Directive (NSPD-51)
- PDD-62
- Presidential directive

== General and cited references ==
- Relyea, Harold C. (26 November 2008). "Presidential Directives: Background and Overview" (PDF). Congressional Research Service. Order Code 98-611 GOV.
- General Accounting Office (14 January 1992). "National security: The use of presidential directives to make and implement U.S. policy: Report to the Chairman, Legislation and National Security Subcommittee, Committee on Government Relations, House of Representatives" (PDF). GAO/NSIAD-92-72.
- General Accounting Office (28 December 1988). "National security: The use of presidential directives to make and implement U.S. policy: Report to the Chairman, Committee on Government Operations, House of Representatives". GAO/NSIAD-89-31.
- Dwyer, Catherine M. (November–December 2002). "The U.S. Presidency and national security directives: An overview". Journal of Government Information. 29 (6): 410–419. doi:10.1016/j.jgi.2002.05.001.
