= Homeland Security Presidential Directive 9 =

Homeland Security Presidential Directive 9 (HSPD-9 -- the Defense of United States Agriculture and Food directive of January 30, 2004) establishes a national policy to protect against terrorist attacks on agriculture and food systems. It directs federal departments and agencies to coordinate their efforts, assess vulnerabilities, prepare response plans, create public awareness, and conduct necessary research. HSPD-9 builds upon HSPD-7, which added agriculture to the list of industries for critical infrastructure protection. HSPD-5 (regarding the national response plan) and HSPD-8 (regarding preparedness) are being used by the USDA Homeland Security Staff in implementing HSPD-9.
