= Main Core =

Alleged American government database

Main Core is an American government database containing information on those believed to be threats to national security.

== History ==
The existence of the database was first asserted in May 2008 by Christopher Ketcham and again in July 2008 by Tim Shorrock.

== Description ==
The Main Core data comes from the NSA, FBI, CIA, and other agencies, and is collected and stored without warrants or court orders. The database's name derives from the fact that it contains copies of the essence of each item (i.e. it contains the main core of each item) of intelligence information on Americans having been produced by the FBI and other agencies of the U.S. intelligence community.

As of 2008, there are eight million Americans listed in the database as possible threats, often for trivial reasons, whom the government may choose to track, question, or detain in a time of crisis.

== See also ==
- Disposition Matrix
- Rex 84
- FBI Index
- Investigative Data Warehouse
- National Security and Homeland Security Presidential Directive
- NSA warrantless surveillance controversy
- PRISM (surveillance program)
