= Homeland Security Presidential Directive 7 =

HSPD-7 was revoked by the Presidential Policy Directive 21 (PPD-21) on Critical Infrastructure, Security and Resilience on February 12, 2013. PPD-21 states that "Plans developed pursuant to HSPD-7 shall remain in effect until specifically revoked or superseded." Multiple changes came out of PPD-21, including a six actions with specific deadlines. One of those actions was to update the National Infrastructure Protection Plan within 240 days.

Homeland Security Presidential Directive 7 (HSPD-7) established the U.S. national policy for identification of and prioritization for protection of critical infrastructure. Signed by George W. Bush on December 17, 2003 it modified previous policy for a post-9/11 country.

It added agriculture to the list of industries for critical infrastructure protection in December 2003. HSPD-7 replaces the 1998 Presidential Decision Directive 63 (PDD-63) that omitted agriculture and food. These directives designate the physical systems that are vulnerable to terrorist attack and are essential for the minimal operation of the economy and the government. Federal agencies are to develop plans to prepare for and counter the threat. In terms of combating terrorism and weapons of mass destruction (WMD), agriculture was included in the National Security Council’s WMD preparedness group formed by Presidential Decision Directive 62 (PDD-62) in 1998. Agroterrorism preparedness is more directly addressed by HSPD-9.
