= Presidential directive =

Instruction or statement by the US president

In the United States, a presidential directive, or executive action, is a written or oral (Note: Some (but not all) sources limit the definition of a presidential directive to the written realm. See § Presidential announcement.) instruction or declaration issued by the president of the United States, which may draw upon the powers vested in the president by the Constitution of the United States, statutory law, or, in certain cases, congressional and judicial acquiescence.

Such directives, which have been issued since the earliest days of the federal government, have become known by various names, and some have prescribed forms and purposes. Presidential directives remain in effect until they are revoked, which the president is free to do. The classification of presidential directives is not easily done, as the distinction between the types can be quite arbitrary, arising from convenience and bureaucratic evolution, and none are defined in the Constitution.

The different types may overlap. As one legal scholar put it, "it is a bit misleading to overclassify presidential directives as comprising separate and distinct 'types' just because they have different headings at the top of the first page." In terms of legal applicability, what matters is the substance of the directive, not the form, unless a certain kind of directive is specifically required by relevant statute.

== Checks and balances ==
Presidential directives may be challenged in court or through congressional action. Congress may revoke or modify a presidential directive, directly or indirectly, but only insofar as the directive is based on congressional legislation. Direct repeal by Congress is quite rare in modern times, because it may be necessary to override a presidential veto, which requires an elusive two-thirds supermajority in both chambers.

== Executive order and presidential proclamations ==
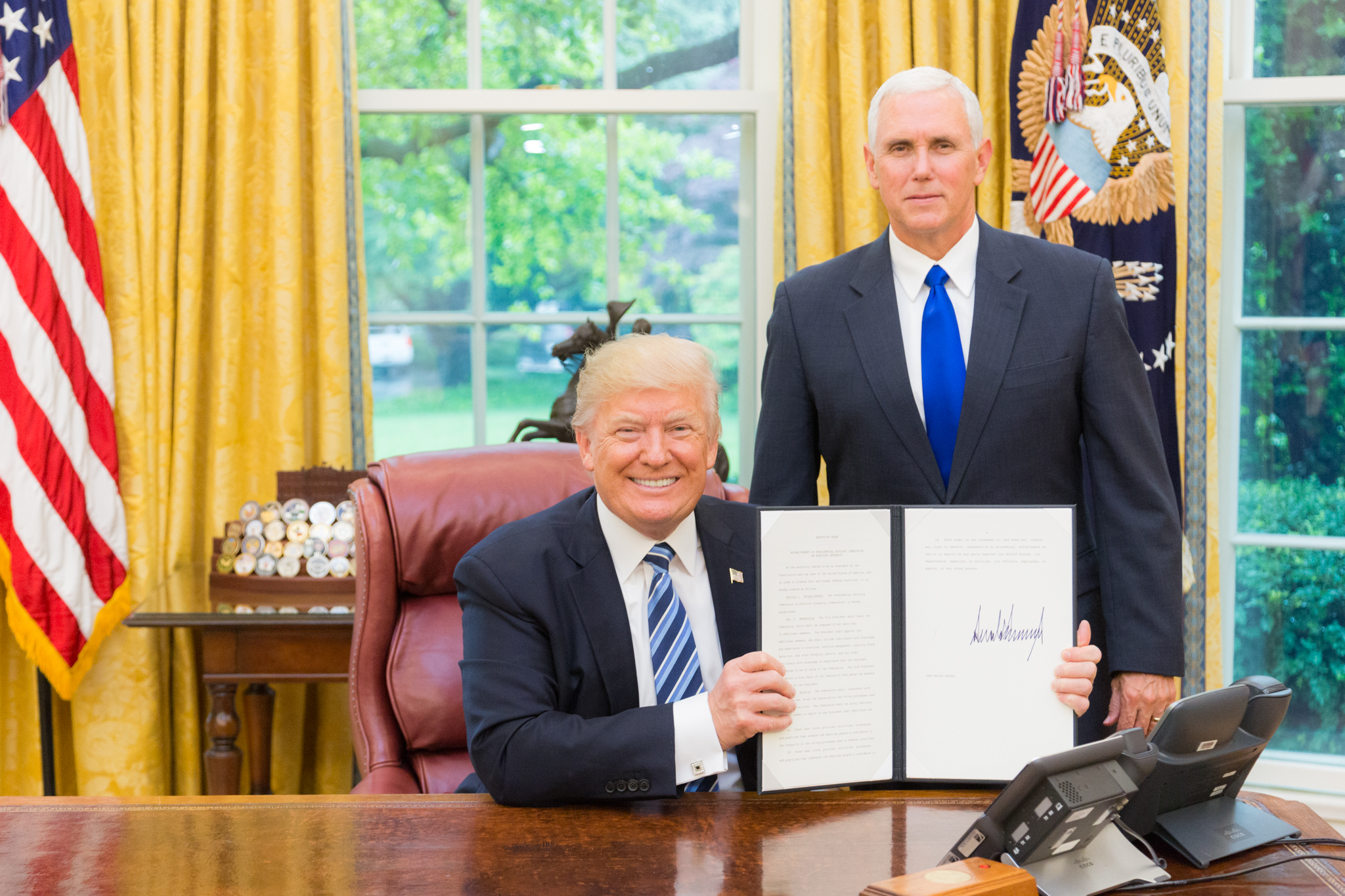
President Donald Trump displaying Executive Order 13799 with Vice President Mike Pence (2017)

Two of the oldest and best-known directives are the executive order and the presidential proclamation. In 1907, the State Department undertook to retroactively number executive orders and presidential proclamations. The denomination of "executive order" was largely due to the fact that the first executive order they chose to number (from 1862) was titled "Executive Order Establishing a Provisional Court in Louisiana". It was an imperfect exercise, however, and many directives were missed. The Federal Register Act of 1935 required both executive orders and proclamations to be published in the Federal Register, with few exceptions. The proper form and routing of executive orders and presidential proclamations has been governed since 1962 by E.O. 11030, as amended.

The first presidential proclamation appeared in October 1789 declaring a day of thanksgiving at the request of Congress. The use of executive orders also stretches back at least to 1789.

== Administrative order ==
The first directive called an administrative order appeared in 1940. Subsequent directives denominated as administrative orders have taken a variety of forms, and have sometimes overlapped with other kinds of presidential directives. A researcher for the Congressional Research Service in 2008 found that in "general, indications are that, during at least the past 40 years, presidential directives published in the Federal Register in forms other than those of executive orders, or proclamations, have been denominated as administrative orders when reproduced in CFR Title 3 compilations." These forms included: "delegations of authority, determinations, directives, findings, letters, memoranda, and orders". A research guide by the National Archives defined administrative orders as "unnumbered signed documents through which the President of the United States conducts the administrative operations of the Federal Government" which "include but are not limited to memoranda, notices, determinations, letters, and messages".

== National security directive ==
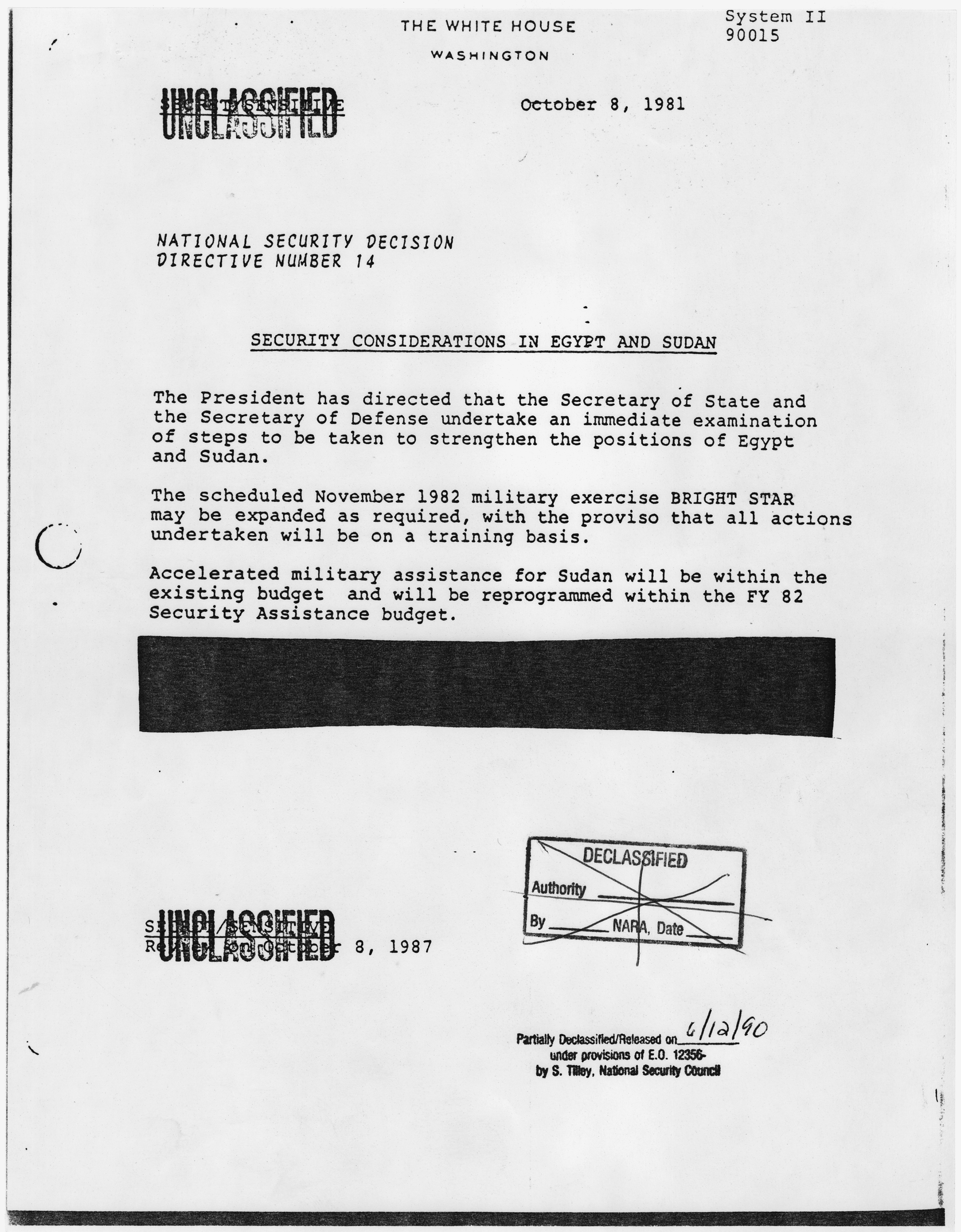
NSDD 14, when it was partially declassified. The directive is now declassified in full.

Names for national security directives

Acronym	Full title	Time frame	Presidential administrations
NSCID	National Security Council Intelligence Directive	1947–1977	Truman–Ford
NSAM	National Security Action Memorandum	1961–1969	Kennedy and Johnson
NSSM	National Security Study Memorandum	1969–1977	Nixon and Ford
NSDM	National Security Decision Memorandum	1969–1977	Nixon and Ford
PRM	Presidential Review Memorandum	1977–1981	Carter
PD	Presidential Directive	1977–1981	Carter
NSSD	National Security Study Directive	1981–1989	Reagan
NSDD	National Security Decision Directive	1981–1989	Reagan
NSR	National Security Review	1989–1993	G. H. W. Bush
NSD	National Security Directive	1989–1993	G. H. W. Bush
PRD	Presidential Review Directive	1993–2001	Clinton
PDD	Presidential Decision Directive	1993–2001	Clinton
NSPD	National Security Presidential Directive	2001–2009	G. W. Bush
PSD	Presidential Study Directive	2009–2017	Obama
PPD	Presidential Policy Directive	2009–2017	Obama
NSPM	National Security Presidential Memorandum	2017–2021, 2025–present	Trump
NSM	National Security Memorandum	2021–2025	Biden

Directives commonly known as national security directives have been issued within the National Security Council by every president since Harry S. Truman in various forms, involving foreign, military and domestic policies. Generally, such directives are highly classified, are not required to be published in the Federal Register, and are available to the public only after "a great many years" have elapsed. Unlike executive orders, national security directives are usually directed only to the National Security Council and the most senior executive branch officials, and embody foreign and military policy-making guidance rather than specific instructions.

== Homeland Security Presidential Directive ==
Homeland Security Presidential Directives (HSPDs) appeared soon after the September 11 attacks, and are sometimes issued concurrently as a national security directive.

=== Selected list of HSPDs ===
- The first such directive created the Homeland Security Council.
- The second changed immigration policies to combat terrorism.
- HSPD 5 directed the Secretary of Homeland Security to develop and run nationally coordinated emergency incident management systems.
- HSPD-7 defines policy for protecting certain key infrastructure; the National Infrastructure Protection Plan was developed to implement the policy.
- HSPD-8 directed Federal agencies to prepare in certain ways for emergencies.
- HSPD-9 established policy to protect against attacks on food and agriculture.
- HSPD-12 assigned responsibility for setting standards for the identification to be shown by persons entering federal government buildings. The technical standard FIPS 201 was developed to satisfy this requirement.
- HSPD-13 established a Maritime Security Policy Coordinating Committee from across federal government agencies.
- HSPD-14 established a Domestic Nuclear Detection Office to coordinate efforts to protect the domestic U.S. against dangers from nuclear or radiological materials.
- HSPD-20 makes definitions and procedures for continuing the federal government after a catastrophic emergency. Federal agencies developed Continuity of Operations Plans in response to this directive.
- HSPD-21, issued October 18, 2007, called for public and private healthcare organizations, hospitals, and healthcare facilities to form "disaster healthcare" system.
- HSPD-23 defines cybersecurity objectives. It was secret at first. The National Cybersecurity Center began in response to this directive.

== Presidential finding ==
Presidential findings (Note: Directives of the same name appeared in the Federal Register from as early as 1954, but for different purposes. See Relyea 2008, p. 12.) are required by statute to be written and signed before covert activities are undertaken, and they must be reported to Congress as soon as possible, before the covert action in question has been initiated. The finding must also be submitted to certain congressional committees. Presidential findings, given their sensitive nature, are classified upon issuance.

== Presidential announcement ==
Presidents often make oral announcements which can be classified as presidential directives, such as Bill Clinton's inauguration of the National Performance Review on March 3, 1993. Although they are not included in the Federal Register, they are often recorded in the Weekly Compilation of Presidential Documents.

== Other directives ==
- Presidential reorganization plans. First permitted by statute in 1939, these directives were used to reorganize the executive branch.
- Designations of officials. First appearing in 1941, these are used to designate individuals to hold specified official positions, and have also been used to delegate presidential authority.
- Letters on tariffs and international trade. These directives have appeared in the Federal Register from its first publication in 1936 to 1979. All but the last were addressed to the secretary of the treasury.
- Military orders. Twelve military orders were issued between 1939 and 1948. No such directives were published in the Federal Register until 2001, when George W. Bush issued a controversial military order on the detention, treatment, and trial by military tribunals of noncitizens alleged to be terrorists.
- Presidential certificates. Only one such instrument under that designation, from 1940, has appeared in the Federal Register, although there is evidence that similar certificates had been issued earlier.
- Regulations. Nine directives so designated were published in the Federal Register between 1939 and 1945, and most of them cited explicit statutory authority for their issuance.
- Presidential general licenses. Only one such directive has been published in the Federal Register. Issued shortly after the attack on Pearl Harbor in 1941, it permitted certain transactions which would otherwise be prohibited by the Trading with the Enemy Act.
- Presidential interpretations. Two presidential interpretations appeared in the Federal Register in 1942–1943, although they were not actually presidential directives, but rather interpretations of earlier ones.

== See also ==
- Executive order
- National security directive
- Presidential determination
- Presidential finding
- Presidential memorandum
- Presidential proclamation
- Presidential Emergency Action Documents
- Signing statement

== Sources ==
- Gaziano, Todd (February 21, 2001). "The Use and Abuse of Executive Orders and Other Presidential Directives". The Heritage Foundation, Center for Legal & Judicial Studies. Archived from the original on February 6, 2017.
- Relyea, Harold C. (November 26, 2008). "Presidential Directives: Background and Overview" (PDF). Congressional Research Service. Order Code 98-611 GOV.
- Chu, Vivian S.; Garvey, Todd (April 16, 2014). "Executive Orders: Issuance, Modification, and Revocation" (PDF). Congressional Research Service. RS20846.
- Contrubis, John (March 9, 1999). "Executive Orders and Proclamations" (PDF). Congressional Research Service. 95-772 A.
- General Accounting Office (January 14, 1992). "National security: The use of presidential directives to make and implement U.S. policy: Report to the Chairman, Legislation and National Security Subcommittee, Committee on Government Relations, House of Representatives" (PDF). GAO/NSIAD-92-72.
- General Accounting Office (December 28, 1988). "National security: The use of presidential directives to make and implement U.S. policy: Report to the Chairman, Committee on Government Operations, House of Representatives" (NSIAD-89-31). GAO/NSIAD-89-31.
- Dwyer, Catherine M. (November–December 2002). "The U.S. Presidency and national security directives: An overview". Journal of Government Information. 29 (6): 410–419. doi:10.1016/j.jgi.2002.05.001.
- Schmeckebier, Laurence F.; Eastin, Roy B. (1939). Government Publications and Their Use. Institute for government research of the Brookings institution. Studies in administration.no. 33 (2nd ed.). Washington, D.C.: Washington, D. C. Proclamations and executive orders, pp. 321–327. hdl:2027/mdp.39015033642011.
