= Violent Radicalization and Homegrown Terrorism Prevention Act of 2007 =

The Violent Radicalization and Homegrown Terrorism Prevention Act of 2007 was a bill sponsored by Rep. Jane Harman (D-CA) in the 110th United States Congress. Its stated purpose is to deal with "homegrown terrorism and violent radicalization" by establishing a national commission, establishing a center for study, and cooperating with other nations.

The bill was introduced to the House as H.R. 1955 on April 19, 2007, and passed on October 23, 2007. It was introduced to the Senate on August 2, 2007, as S-1959. The bill defines some terms including "violent radicalization," "homegrown terrorism," and "ideologically based violence," which have provoked controversy from some quarters. The bill failed to become law during the 110th Congress.

== Summary ==
The bill would have:

1. Amended the Homeland Security Act of 2002 to add provisions concerning the prevention of homegrown terrorism (terrorism by individuals born, raised, or based and operating primarily in the United States).
2. Directed the Secretary of Homeland Security to:
  1. Establish a grant program to prevent radicalization (use of an extremist belief system for facilitating ideologically based violence) and homegrown terrorism in the United States;
  2. Establish or designate a university-based Center of Excellence for the Study of Radicalization and Homegrown Terrorism in the United States;
  3. Conduct a survey of methodologies implemented by foreign nations to prevent radicalization and homegrown terrorism.
3. Prohibited the Department of Homeland Security's efforts to prevent ideologically based violence and homegrown terrorism from violating the constitutional and civil rights, and civil liberties, of U.S. citizens and lawful permanent residents.

== Defined terms ==
1. Violent Radicalization - the process of adopting or promoting an extremist belief system for the purpose of facilitating ideologically based violence to advance political, religious, or social change.
2. Homegrown Terrorism - the use, planned use, or threatened use, of force or violence by a group or individual born, raised, or based and operating primarily within the United States or any possession of the United States to intimidate or coerce the United States government, the civilian population of the United States, or any segment thereof, in furtherance of political or social objectives.
3. Ideologically Based Violence - the use, planned use, or threatened use of force or violence by a group or individual to promote the group or individual's political, religious, or social beliefs.

== Co-sponsors ==
=== House ===
In addition to Rep. Jane Harman (D-CA), who introduced the bill to the House, it had 15 co-sponsors as of October 24, 2007:

1. Rep. Christopher Carney (D-PA)
2. Del. Donna Christensen (D-VI)
3. Rep. Yvette Clarke (D-NY)
4. Rep. Charlie Dent (R-PA)
5. Rep. Norman Dicks (D-WA)
6. Rep. Al Green (D-TX)
7. Rep. James Langevin (D-RI)
8. Rep. Zoe Lofgren (D-CA)
9. Rep. Nita Lowey (D-NY)
10. Rep. Daniel Lungren (R-CA)
11. Rep. Ed Perlmutter (D-CO)
12. Rep. Ted Poe (R-TX)
13. Rep. Dave Reichert (R-WA)
14. Rep. Bennie Thompson (D-MS)

=== Senate ===
In addition to Sen. Susan Collins (R-ME), who introduced the bill to the Senate, it had one co-sponsor as of December 26, 2007:

1. Sen. Norm Coleman (R-MN)

== Current status ==
=== House ===
This bill was passed in the House on October 23, 2007, with a vote of 404 to 6. Twenty-two representatives missed the vote. The only six representatives who voted against the bill were:

- Jeff Flake, R-Arizona
- Dana Rohrabacher, R-California
- Neil Abercrombie, D-Hawaii
- Jerry Costello, D-Illinois
- Dennis Kucinich, D-Ohio
- John Duncan, R-Tennessee

Representative Ron Paul (R - TX), who was not present at the time of the vote, subsequently rose on the House floor to express his opposition to the bill.

=== Senate ===
The bill was introduced to the Senate on August 2, 2007, as Senate Bill 1959, and has been referred to the Committee on Homeland Security and Governmental Affairs. The Bill was introduced by Sen. Susan Collins (R-ME), and has been co-sponsored by Sen. Norm Coleman (R-MN).

== Timeline ==
=== House ===
- Introduced: April 19, 2007
- Scheduled for Debate: August 1, 2007
- Passed House [details]: October 23, 2007

=== Senate ===
- Introduced: August 2, 2007
- Scheduled for Debate: -
- Voted on in Senate: -
- Signed by President: -

== Criticism and reaction ==
=== Points of criticism ===
The bill has provoked controversy on several fronts, including from groups such as the American Civil Liberties Union.

One criticism is that the definitions of "force," "home grown terrorism," and "violent radicalization" (section 899A) are overly broad or vague, and that the vagueness in these definitions would permit the government to classify many types of venerated American political activity normally protected by the First Amendment, such as civil disobedience, as terrorism. Critics frequently cite Section 899A, which reads, in part: "The use, planned use, or threatened use, of force ...to coerce the ..government, (or) civilian population ..in furtherance of political or social objectives", as particularly problematic. They argue that major societal reforms, which are now accepted but were perceived at the time as threatening to the government, such as civil rights, women's suffrage, and others, would be classified as terrorism.

=== Political reaction ===
Then-presidential candidate Dennis Kucinich said he believed the bill to be "unconstitutional" and has referred to the bill as a "thought crime bill".

Representative Ron Paul (R-TX), addressed the bill in the House on Dec. 5, 2007 saying:

This seems to be an unwise and dangerous solution in search of a real problem. Previous acts of ideologically motivated violence, though rare, have been resolved successfully using law enforcement techniques, existing laws against violence, and our court system.

In North Carolina, Republican Congressional candidate BJ Lawson has made the bill a theme in his campaign against Democrat David Price, who voted in favor of the bill.

=== Media reaction ===
The Baltimore Sun published an opinion article by professor emeritus Ralph E. Shaffer and R. William Robinson, titled "Here come the thought police."

The Pioneer Press published an article by Professor Peter Erlinder, pointing out disturbing parallels to the House Un-American Activities Committee.

In an interview aired on Democracy Now, academic and author Ward Churchill said: "HR 1955, as I understand it, provides a basis for subjective interpretation of dissident speech...."

Kamau Franklin of the Center for Constitutional Rights said that the bill "concentrates on the internet as a place where terrorist rhetoric or ideas have been coming across into the United States and to American citizens."

The Hartford Advocate, noting that all of Connecticut's Representatives had voted for the bill, sought to interview one of them, but reported that none of them would comment on the record, personally or through a spokesperson, about their reasons for voting in favor. The Advocate concluded that the problem with the bill was "not that the bill threatens anything specific, but that it's far too vague."

An op-ed in the San Francisco Chronicle, discussed HR 1955 in the context of the Homeland Security concept of Endgame. The article garnered several hundred readers comments when it was originally published. "HR 1955 is an important topic that continues to be largely absent from mainstream media as of Nov 23, 2008. President elect Obama, served on Lieberman's Homeland Security committee in the US Senate wherein the Senate bill version Titled: S-1959 continues to be discussed, absent mainstream scrutiny, but has garnered widespread internet-web scrutiny." (accessed on Nov 23, 2008) "

The New York Times editorialized that "The Internet is simply a means of communication, like the telephone, but that has not prevented attempts to demonize it — the latest being the ludicrous claim that the Internet promotes terrorism." (accessed on Jan 2, 2009). "

The internet, if considered to be "new media" includes this offering by OpenCongress.org, a project of the Sunlight Foundation and PDF. All 26 comments about S. 1959 dating from 2008. "

=== Institutional reaction ===
The American Civil Liberties Union (ACLU) issued a statement saying: "Law enforcement should focus on action, not thought. We need to worry about the people who are committing crimes rather than those who harbor beliefs that the government may consider to be extreme."

The National Lawyers Guild and the Society of American Law Teachers issued a joint statement opposing the Bill: "The National Lawyers Guild and the Society of American Law Teachers strongly urge the Senate to refuse to pass the Violent Radicalization and Homegrown Terrorism Prevention Act of 2007."

The Center for Constitutional Rights opposes the bill.

The John Birch Society wrote in an Action Alert: "the legislation could attack First Amendment rights by mandating the government to clamp down on free speech online, among other things."

=== Responses to criticism ===
Harman replied by letter to criticisms from the director of the American Civil Liberties Union's legislative office. Caroline Fredrickson asserted "the bill should read 'intentionally aiding and abetting' violent radicalization, 'because otherwise you're really looking at what someone's thought processes are, what their ideology is, and not what they're doing.'" Harman defended the resolution, saying: "HR 1955 is not about interfering with speech or belief. The hearing record makes that abundantly clear. Radical speech, as I have said repeatedly, is protected under our Constitution."

Harman chaired a November 6, 2007 hearing of the House Homeland Security Subcommittee on Intelligence, Information Sharing, and Terrorism Risk Assessment on "Using the Web as a Weapon: the Internet as a Tool for Violent Radicalization and Homegrown Terrorism." In her statement before the hearing Harman tied its subject to Resolution 1955.

In December 2007 the United States House Committee on Homeland Security released a "fact sheet" entitled "Understanding HR 1955: The Violent Radicalization and Homegrown Terrorism Prevention Act of 2007" which elaborates on the rationale and purpose of the bill and includes a "Myth vs. Fact" section offering rebuttals to the perception that the bill would "criminalize constitutionally-protected behavior" or "lead to Internet censorship".

== See also ==
- Alien and Sedition Acts
- House Un-American Activities Committee
- Sedition Act of 1918 / Espionage Act of 1917
- Subversive Activities Control Act of 1950 (McCarran Internal Security Act)
- NSPD-51
- REX-84
