= Camille Marino =

American activist (born 1964)

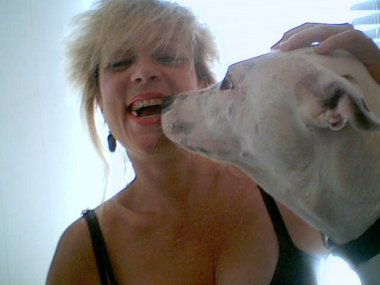
- Marino with her dog Max (2011)
- Born: July 5, 1964; Brooklyn, New York City, New York
- Died: June 15, 2026 (aged 61)

Camille A. Marino (1964 - 2026) was an American animal rights activist. Marino was known for her extreme tactics against medical researchers that she alleges use animal experimentation, including doxing, harassment and death threats, as well as destruction of property.

== Negotiation Is Over/Eleventh Hour for Animals ==
In 2009, she founded Negotiation Is Over (NIO) which advocated diverse tactics including intimidation and violence. The group was composed of small cells of activists working in dozens of countries on several continents. In 2012, the Southern Poverty Law Center classified NIO as a domestic hate group. NIO's local campaign to stop animal experimentation at the University of Florida was named Eleventh Hour for Animals.

== University of Florida ==
In 2010, she sued the University of Florida (UF) after they refused to disclose public information about their animal experimentation program. On December 30, 2011, Circuit Court Judge Martha Ann Lott ordered UF to disclose their primate experimentation records. Information that was redacted in those documents was challenged and in February 2013, a precedent was set in Florida when an appeals court ruled that the locations of the University of Florida's animal labs were public record.

On February 4, 2012, Camille Marino was arrested protesting primate experimentation at The University of Florida. She was to be extradited to face charges in Detroit leveled by a Wayne State University researcher.

== Wayne State University incident ==
In October 2011, a Wayne State University (WSU) researcher obtained a restraining order against Camille Marino demanding that she remove his personal information from her NIO website in Florida. She refused and was charged with a misdemeanor count of civil contempt in Detroit. Marino staged an act of civil disobedience on the WSU campus, chaining herself to the library and taping her mouth.

She was charged with trespassing as well as two felonies: aggravated stalking and the unlawful posting of a message with aggravated circumstances. The aggravated stalking charge for violating the restraining order was dropped. To the second charge, which involved threatening the torture and murder of a medical researcher, she pleaded guilty and served six months.

== Issue with fellow activist ==
In 2012, Steven Best, a fellow activist, took out a restraining order in New Mexico which sought to prevent her from contacting him or speaking about him, alleging that Marino had developed a “fatal attraction, love/hate” relationship towards him and thus she began stalking and threatening violence against him.
