= Louis O. Giuffrida =

Jeff Giuffrida

Director of the Federal Emergency Management Agency
- In office May 1981 – September 1, 1985
- President: Ronald Reagan
- Preceded by: John McConnell (acting)
- Succeeded by: Robert Morris (acting)

Personal details
- Born: Louis Onorato Giuffrida; October 2, 1920 Middletown, Connecticut, U.S.
- Died: November 20, 2012 (aged 92) Claremont, California, U.S.
- Party: Republican
- Education: University of Connecticut (BA); Boston University (MA)

Louis Onorato "Jeff" Giuffrida (October 2, 1920 – November 20, 2012) was the Ronald Reagan administration's first director of the Federal Emergency Management Agency from 1981 to 1985.

Giuffrida graduated from the University of Connecticut (B.A.) and Boston University (M.A.).

He had a lengthy career in the U.S. Army, attaining the rank of colonel in 1968.

As originally reported by Alfonso Chardy in a newspaper article in the Miami Herald, July 5, 1987, at the US Army War College, Giuffrida wrote a thesis outlining a military plan for the forcible relocation of millions of black Americans to concentration camps in the event of a national emergency involving racial strife. This is debatable as the thesis referenced below states it would take 14 years to relocate them forcibly. The thesis appears to refer to 500K self-described militants (see page 38) being relocated. On page 41, he appears to question whether this is even realistic. Much of the thesis appears to be devoted to the history of racism and concludes that the treatment of blacks in the army offers a positive example to society (see pages 1 and 47) Prior to September 2014 the Miami Herald article was the only publication to share details about Giuffrida's thesis.

In 1971 he left the Army and organized the California Specialized Training Institute for then California Governor Reagan. The institute trained state employees in emergency management and police in counter-terrorism activities. It was during this time that Giuffrida became friends with Edwin Meese.

He also served as an advisor on terrorism, emergency management, and other special topics for Governor Reagan. He was eventually promoted to the rank of general in the California Militia [see Title 32 U.S. Code]. Giuffrida was confirmed on May 18, 1981. At the time of his nomination Giuffrida was president of the Specialized Management Services Co. and director of the California Specialized Training Institute.

During his tenure at FEMA, Giuffrida developed much of FEMA's civil defense programs, including Continuity of Government.

Giuffrida was eventually forced out of the agency in 1985 after a Congressional investigation alleged that he spent government money to build a private residence at FEMA's Emergency Management Institute in Emmitsburg, Maryland as well as mismanagement and fraud. After Giuffrida's tenure at FEMA, he was hired by Lyndon LaRouche's organization as a security consultant.

Government offices
Preceded by John McConnell; Acting	Director of the Federal Emergency Management Agency; 1981–1985	Succeeded by Robert Morris; Acting
