= National Security and Homeland Security Presidential Directive =

American directive

Directive 51
- National Security and Homeland Security Presidential Directive 51
- Other short titles: NSPD51, HSPD20, ED51
- President: George W. Bush
- Signed: May 4, 2007

Summary
- The directive "establishes a comprehensive national policy on the continuity of Federal Government structures and operations" in the event of a "catastrophic emergency"

The National Security and Homeland Security Presidential Directive (National Security Presidential Directive NSPD 51/Homeland Security Presidential Directive HSPD-20, sometimes called simply "Executive Directive 51" for short), signed by President of the United States George W. Bush on May 4, 2007, is a Presidential Directive establishing a comprehensive policy on the federal government structures and operations in the event of a "catastrophic emergency". Such an emergency is defined as "any incident, regardless of location, that results in extraordinary levels of mass casualties, damage, or disruption severely affecting the U.S. population, infrastructure, environment, economy, or government functions."

The unclassified portion of the directive (which replaced President Bill Clinton's 1998 Presidential Decision Directive 67), was posted on the White House website on May 9, 2007, without any further announcement or press briefings, although Special Assistant to George W. Bush Gordon Johndroe answered several questions on the matter when asked about it by members of the press in early June 2007.

== Details ==
This presidential directive defines the "national essential functions" of the federal government, specifies "continuity requirements" for the departments and agencies in the federal government's executive branch, and "provides guidance for state, local, territorial, and tribal governments, and private sector organizations. It also provides for the Homeland Security Advisor, who is designated as the National Continuity Coordinator, will oversee the "development and implementation of federal continuity policies." This policy development would be done "in coordination with the Assistant to the President for National Security Affairs, without exercising directive authority."

The source text indicates that during a catastrophic emergency the federal government will cooperate as a matter of comity in order to protect the Constitution:

(e) "Enduring Constitutional Government," or "ECG," means a cooperative effort among the executive, legislative, and judicial branches of the Federal Government, coordinated by the President, as a matter of comity with respect to the legislative and judicial branches and with proper respect for the constitutional separation of powers among the branches, to preserve the constitutional framework under which the Nation is governed and the capability of all three branches of government to execute constitutional responsibilities and provide for orderly succession, appropriate transition of leadership, and interoperability and support of the National Essential Functions during a catastrophic emergency;

The source text for NSPD51 repeatedly reaffirms constitutionality and specifically states that "(9) Recognizing that each branch of the Federal Government is responsible for its own continuity programs, an official designated by the Chief of Staff to the President shall ensure that the executive branch's Continuity of Operations and Continuity of Government policies in support of Enduring Constitutional Government efforts are appropriately coordinated with those of the legislative and judicial branches in order to ensure interoperability and allocate national assets efficiently to maintain a functioning Federal Government."

Conservative activist Jerome Corsi and Marjorie Cohn of the National Lawyers Guild have said that this is a violation of the Constitution of the United States in that the three branches of government are separate and equal, with no single branch coordinating the others. The directive, created by the president, claims that the president has the power to declare a catastrophic emergency. It does not specify who has the power to declare the emergency over.

The directive further says that, in the case of such an emergency, the new position of "National Continuity Coordinator" would be filled by the assistant to the president for Homeland Security, currently Stephen Miller. The directive also specifies that a "Continuity Policy Coordination Committee", to be chaired by a senior director of the Homeland Security Council staff, and selected by the National Continuity Coordinator, shall be "the main day-to-day forum for such policy coordination".

The directive ends by describing a number of "annexes", of which Annex A is described as being not classified but which does not appear on the directive's Web page:

(23) Annex A and the classified Continuity Annexes, attached hereto, are hereby incorporated into and made a part of this directive.

(24) Security. This directive and the information contained herein shall be protected from unauthorized disclosure, provided that, except for Annex A, the Annexes attached to this directive are classified and shall be accorded appropriate handling, consistent with applicable Executive Orders.

The "National Continuity Policy, Annex A, Categories of Departments and Agencies", available from the Financial and Banking Information Infrastructure Committee website, indicates that "executive departments and agencies are assigned to one of four categories commensurate with their COOP/COG/ECG responsibilities during an emergency".

== Reception ==
The signing of this Directive was generally not covered by the mainstream U.S. media or discussed by the U.S. Congress. While similar executive security directives have been issued by previous presidents, with their texts kept secret, this is the first to be made public in part. It is unclear how the National Security and Homeland Security Presidential Directive will reconcile with the National Emergencies Act, a U.S. federal law passed in 1976, which gives Congress oversight over presidential emergency powers during such emergencies. The National Emergencies Act is not mentioned in the text of the National Security and Homeland Security Presidential Directive.

After receiving concerned communications from constituents, in July 2007 U.S. Representative and Homeland Security Committee member Peter DeFazio made an official request to examine the classified Continuity Annexes described above in a secure "bubbleroom" in the United States Capitol, but his request was denied by the White House, which cited "national security concerns." This was the first time DeFazio had been denied access to documents. He was quoted as saying, "We're talking about the continuity of the government of the United States of America ... I would think that would be relevant to any member of Congress, let alone a member of the Homeland Security Committee." After this denial, DeFazio joined with two colleagues (Bennie Thompson, chairman of the committee; and Chris Carney, chairman of the Homeland Security oversight subcommittee) in a renewed effort to gain access to the documents.

== See also ==
- Main Core
- State of emergency
- Continuity of government
- Continuity of Operations Plan
- Presidential directive
- United States Department of Homeland Security
- REX-84
- Posse Comitatus Act
- National Emergencies Act
- State secrets privilege
- Violent Radicalization and Homegrown Terrorism Prevention Act of 2007
- Directive 51 (novel)
- Tom Clancy's The Division
