= Bank Markazi v. Peterson =

- Supreme Court of the United States

Argued January 13, 2016 Decided April 20, 2016
- Full case name: Bank Markazi, a.k.a. the Central Bank of Iran, Petitioner v. Deborah Peterson, et al.
- Docket no.: 14-770
- Citations: 578 U.S. ___ (more) 136 S. Ct. 1310; 194 L. Ed. 2d 463; 2016 U.S. LEXIS 2799
- Argument: Oral argument
- Opinion announcement: Opinion announcement

Case history
- Prior: Peterson, et al. v. Islamic Republic of Iran, Bank Markazi a.k.a. Central Bank of Iran, Banca UBAE, Citibank, and Clearstream Banking, No. 10 Civ. 4518 (S.D. NY, July 9, 2013); affirmed, Peterson, et al. v. Islamic Republic of Iran, et al., 758 F.3d 185 (2nd Cir., 2014)

Holding
- A law that only applied to a specific case, identified by docket number, and eliminated all of the defenses one party had raised did not violate the separation of powers in the United States Constitution between the legislative (Congress) and judicial branches of government; since it pertained to the immunity of assets of a foreign state, it was also justified as a valid exercise of Congress' authority in foreign policy matters

Court membership
- Chief Justice John Roberts Associate Justices Anthony Kennedy · Clarence Thomas; Ruth Bader Ginsburg · Stephen Breyer; Samuel Alito · Sonia Sotomayor; Elena Kagan

Case opinions
- Majority: Ginsburg, joined by Kennedy, Breyer, Alito, Kagan; Thomas (all but Part II–C)
- Dissent: Roberts, joined by Sotomayor

Laws applied
- 22 U.S.C. § 8772

Bank Markazi v. Peterson, 578 U.S. 212 (2016), was a United States Supreme Court case that found that a law which only applied to a specific case, identified by docket number, and eliminated all of the defenses one party had raised does not violate the separation of powers in the United States Constitution between the legislative (Congress) and judicial branches of government. The plaintiffs, in the case had initially obtained judgments against Iran for its role in supporting state-sponsored terrorism, particularly the 1983 Beirut barracks bombings and 1996 Khobar Towers bombing, and sought execution against a bank account in New York held, through European intermediaries, on behalf of Bank Markazi, the Central Bank of the Islamic Republic of Iran. The plaintiffs obtained court orders preventing the transfer of funds from the account in 2008 and initiated their lawsuit in 2010. Bank Markazi raised several defenses, including that the account was not an asset of the bank, but rather an asset of its European intermediary, under both New York state property law and §201(a) of the Terrorism Risk Insurance Act. In response to concerns that existing laws were insufficient for the account to be used to settle the judgments, Congress added an amendment to a 2012 bill, codified after enactment as 22 U.S.C. § 8772, that identified the pending lawsuit by docket number, applied only to the assets in the identified case, and effectively abrogated every legal basis available to Bank Markazi to prevent the plaintiffs from executing their claims against the account. Bank Markazi then argued that § 8772 was an unconstitutional breach of the separation of power between the legislative and judicial branches of government, because it effectively directed a particular result in a single case without changing the generally applicable law. The United States District Court for the Southern District of New York and, on appeal, the United States Court of Appeals for the Second Circuit both upheld the constitutionality of § 8772 and cleared the way for the plaintiffs to execute their judgments against the account, which held about $1.75 billion in cash.

The United States Supreme Court granted certiorari and heard oral arguments in the case in January 2016, releasing their opinion in April 2016. A 6–2 majority found that § 8772 was not unconstitutional, because it "changed the law by establishing new substantive standards"—essentially, that if Iran owns the assets, they would be available for execution against judgments against Iran—for the district court to apply to the case. Justice Ruth Bader Ginsburg, writing for the majority, explained that the federal judiciary has long upheld laws that affect one or a very small number of subjects as a valid exercise of Congress' legislative power and that the Supreme Court had previously upheld a statute that applied to cases identified by docket number in Robertson v. Seattle Audubon Society (1992). The majority also upheld § 8772 as a valid exercise of Congress' authority over foreign affairs. Prior to the enactment of the Foreign Sovereign Immunities Act (FSIA) in 1976, Congress and the Executive branch had authority to determine the immunity of foreign states from lawsuits. Despite transferring the authority to determine immunity to the courts through the FSIA, the majority contended that "it remains Congress' prerogative to alter a foreign state's immunity."

Chief Justice John Roberts, joined by Justice Sonia Sotomayor, dissented and harshly criticized the majority's holding. After providing historical context for the separation of powers between the legislature and judiciary found in Article III of the United States Constitution, the Roberts argued that § 8772 was an unconstitutional breach of the separation of powers between Congress and the judiciary "whereby Congress assumes the role of judge and decides a particular case in the first instance." In his view, § 8772 is not different from a hypothetical law applying to a case Smith v. Jones in which the legislature says simply "Smith wins". Roberts contended that Congress and the Executive branch have sufficient authority that they do not need to "seize" the judiciary's power to "make a political decision look like a judicial one." Quoting James Madison in Federalist No. 48, he lamented that this case "will indeed become a blueprint for extensive expansion of the legislative power at the judiciary's expense, feeding Congress's tendency to 'extend[] the sphere of its activity and draw[] all power into its impetuous vortex.'"

The decision came as Iran was seeking access to the world financial market just three months after many sanctions were lifted as a result of Iran's compliance with an agreement for curtailing development of its nuclear enrichment program. Various Iranian officials denounced the decision as "theft", "a ridicule of law and justice", and "open hostility by the United States against the Iranian people."

On 14 June 2016, Iran filed a case against the United States with the International Court of Justice (ICJ). The judgment in the case, named Certain Iranian Assets, was pronounced on 30 March 2023, with the ICJ finding largely in Iran's favour.

== Background ==
=== State immunity ===
Foreign states generally enjoy immunity from lawsuits in the United States under the Foreign Sovereign Immunities Act (FSIA). The FSIA is the exclusive basis for U.S. courts to exercise jurisdiction over a foreign government. Prior to enactment of the FSIA in 1976, the executive branch was responsible for determining the immunity of foreign states on a case-by-case basis. By enacting the FSIA, Congress codified the guidelines for the immunity of foreign states and transferred responsibility for determining a foreign state's immunity from the executive branch to the judiciary.

The FSIA contains an exception to the immunity of foreign states for victims of state-sponsored terrorism. Prior to 2002, if a judgment was awarded against a foreign government, only assets of the foreign government that were located in the U.S. and "used for commercial activity" could have been seized to satisfy the judgment. To make judgments easier to enforce, Congress enacted the Terrorism Risk Insurance Act of 2002 (TRIA) which allows judgments to be executed against "the blocked assets of [a] terrorist party." Blocked assets include assets that may be seized by the President pursuant to his authority granted by Congress.

=== Litigation before § 8772 was enacted ===
The suit involved more than 1,300 individuals who had won several separate judgments against Iran for its supportive role in the 1983 Beirut barracks bombings, the 1996 Khobar Towers bombing, several other bombings, an assassination, and a kidnapping. After winning judgments by default, based on a clear evidentiary basis for Iran's liability, they sought writs of execution against a Citibank account in New York connected with Iran's central bank. The suits for execution against the Citibank account were consolidated into one case through various procedural mechanisms.

The named plaintiff in the case, Deborah Peterson, is the sister of a victim of the Beirut barracks bombings; joined by victims and other relatives of victims, she had won a default judgment in 2003 against Iran for its role in the bombings. Because of the large number of plaintiffs in the case—almost 1,000—the judge appointed special masters to determine each plaintiff's right to collect damages and appropriate amount of damages; in 2007, the judge entered a default judgment against Iran for $2,656,944,877 in damages.

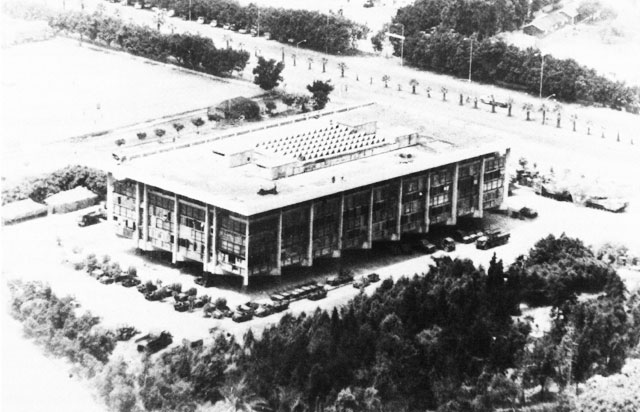
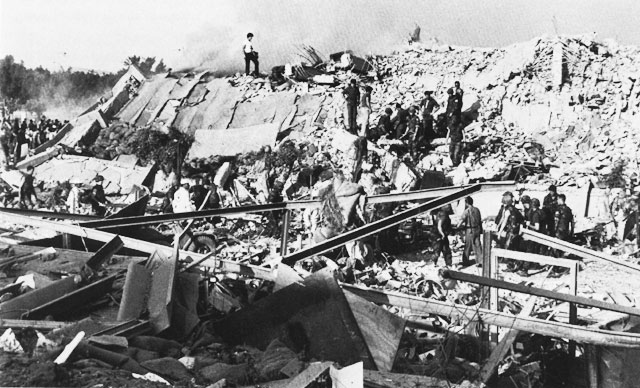
The USMC barracks before and after the 1983 bombing

In 2008, the plaintiffs first learned of the interests of the Central Bank of Iran (Bank Markazi) in a Citibank bank account in New York and obtained orders restraining the transfer of funds from the account. The account consisted of bonds and belonged to a Luxembourg-based bank, Clearstream Banking, S.A., which held the account on behalf of Bank Markazi and deposited interest from the bonds into Bank Markazi's Clearstream account. At some point in 2008, an account for Bank Markazi was opened with Italian bank Banca UBAE to place the interest payments from the Clearstream account, placing a second intermediary between Bank Markazi and the Citibank account. By the time of the Supreme Court hearing, the Citibank account held about $1.75 billion in cash, as the last of the bonds had matured in April 2012. In 2010, the plaintiffs initiated their lawsuit against Bank Markazi, Clearstream, Banca UBAE, and Citibank, jointly, seeking to execute against the Citibank account their judgments for damages against Iran, based on §201(a) of the TRIA, which provides that when "a person has obtained a judgment against a terrorist party ... the blocked assets of that terrorist party (including the blocked assets of any agency or instrumentality of that terrorist party) shall be subject to execution or attachment."

In February 2012, President Obama froze all assets of the Iranian government in the U.S., which included the Citibank account alleged to be controlled by Bank Markazi. However, there were concerns that existing laws were insufficient for the account to be used to settle the judgments. Bank Markazi claimed that the account was not an asset of Bank Markazi, but its intermediary, Clearstream, in relation to both TRIA and New York state property law.

=== Section 8772 ===
Due to the issues raised in the case, Congress included a section within the Iran Threat Reduction and Syria Human Rights Act, codified as 22 U.S.C. § 8772, that preempted any state law and provided that:

a financial asset that is—

(A) held in the United States for a foreign securities intermediary doing business in the United States;
(B) a blocked asset (whether or not subsequently unblocked) that is property described in subsection (b); and
(C) equal in value to a financial asset of Iran, including an asset of the central bank or monetary authority of the Government of Iran or any agency or instrumentality of that Government, that such foreign securities intermediary or a related intermediary holds abroad

shall be subject to execution or attachment in aid of execution in order to satisfy any judgment to the extent of any compensatory damages awarded against Iran for damages for personal injury or death caused by an act of torture, extrajudicial killing, aircraft sabotage, or hostage-taking, or the provision of material support or resources for such an act.

— 22 U.S.C. § 8772(a)(1)

In response to concerns the banking industry had to early drafts of the legislation, § 8772 specified the assets that the section pertains to as:

The financial assets described in this section are the financial assets that are identified in and the subject of proceedings in the United States District Court for the Southern District of New York in Peterson et al. v. Islamic Republic of Iran et al., Case No. 10 Civ. 4518 (BSJ) (GWG), that were restrained by restraining notices and levies secured by the plaintiffs in those proceedings, as modified by court order dated June 27, 2008, and extended by court orders dated June 23, 2009, May 10, 2010, and June 11, 2010, so long as such assets remain restrained by court order.

— 22 U.S.C. § 8772(b)

Section 8772 also specified that the courts needed to identify "whether Iran holds equitable title to, or the beneficial interest in, the assets ...and that no other person possesses a constitutionally protected interest in the assets ...under the Fifth Amendment to the Constitution of the United States." If another person held a constitutionally protected interest in the assets, their interest in the assets would not be infringed by the law.

=== After § 8772 was enacted ===
Section 8772 eliminated all of Bank Markazi's defenses to the seizure of the account's assets, valued at approximately $1.75 billion. Bank Markazi conceded that they held "equitable title to, or beneficial interest in, the assets", per §8772(a)(2)(A), but then claimed that § 8772 violated the separation of powers in the United States Constitution between the legislative (Congress) and judicial branches of government. The United States District Court for the Southern District of New York and, on appeal, the United States Court of Appeals for the Second Circuit both upheld the constitutionality of § 8772 and awarded the assets to the plaintiffs.

== Appeal to the Supreme Court of the United States ==
On December 29, 2014, Bank Markazi filed a petition for certiorari with the Supreme Court of the United States, requesting the Court to consider the question: Does § 8772 violate the separation of powers by purporting to change the law for, and directing a particular result in, a single pending case? The certiorari petition was circulated to the Justices for their conference on April 3, 2015, after a brief by the respondents (Peterson) opposing certiorari and a reply brief from the petitioner (Bank Markazi) were filed in March. Following the April 3rd conference, the Court called for the Solicitor General to file a brief expressing the views of the federal government, which was filed on August 19. In May and June, the Supreme Court meets only to issue orders and opinions and does not hear oral arguments until the next term begins. The Court granted certiorari following its conference on September 28.

Oral arguments were held on January 13, 2016, with appearances by Jeffrey Lamken for the petitioner, Theodore Olson for the respondents, and Deputy Solicitor General Edwin Kneedler for the United States as amicus curiae. Justice Antonin Scalia was present during oral arguments. He died in February, voiding his vote in the initial vote on the case's outcome and precluding any draft opinion he may have written from being published by the Court. The Court's 6-2 opinion was delivered on April 20, 2016.

== Oral argument ==
On January 13, 2016, during oral argument with Theodore Olson, Chief Justice John Roberts said:

And just so you understand what I'm concerned about. You know, there are places in the world where courts function just the way our courts do, except every now and then, when there's a case that the -- the strong man who runs the country is interested in because a crony is one of the parties or whatever, and he picks up the phone and he tells the court, You decide this case this way. And I don't care what you thought the law was, decide it this way.

— Bank Markazi, oral argument

His dissenting opinion is discussed in detail below.

== Opinion of the Court ==
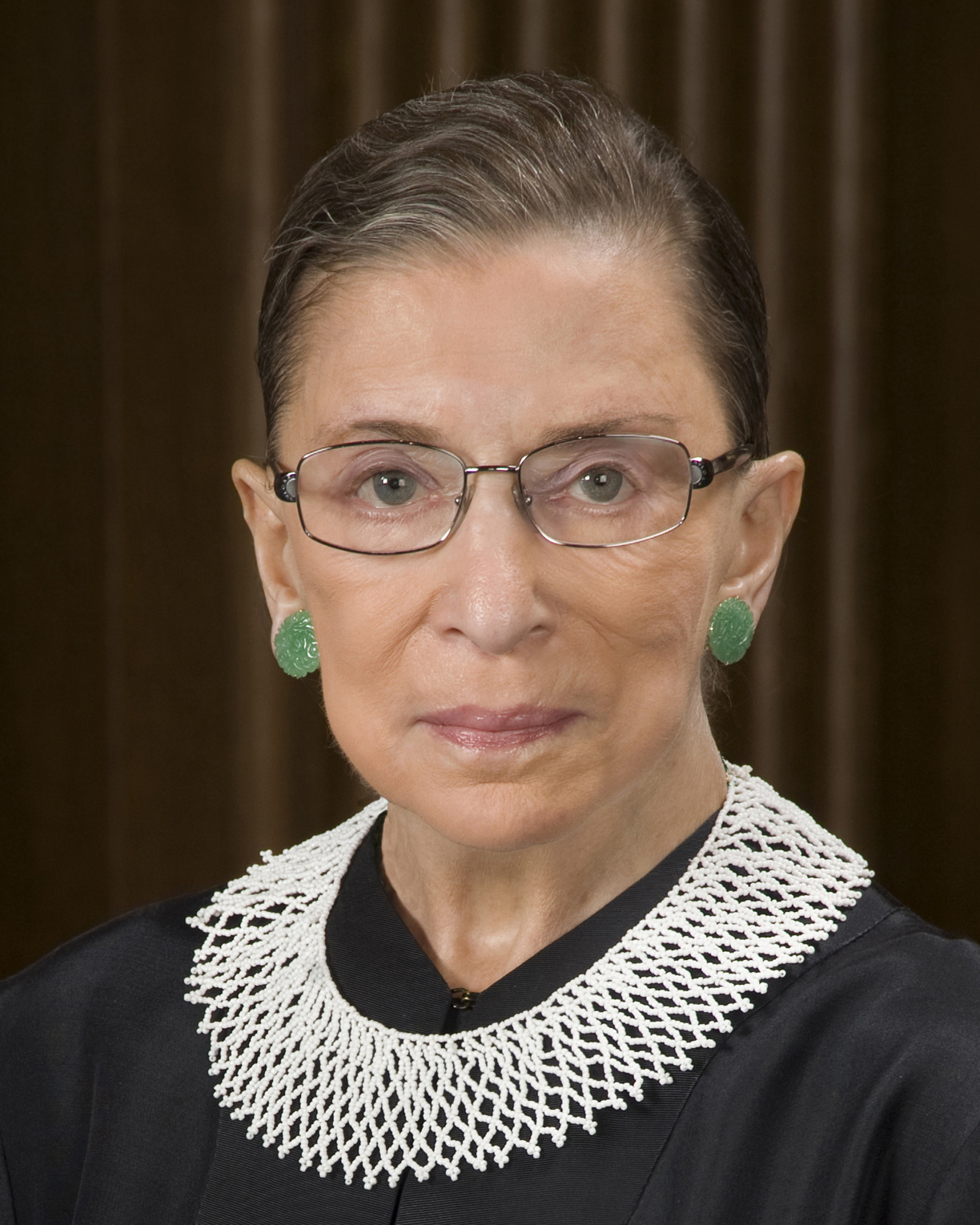
Justice Ginsburg, who authored the majority opinion

Justice Ruth Bader Ginsburg wrote the majority opinion, which held that § 8772 does not infringe on the separation of powers between the legislative and judicial branches of government, considering also that the law is an exercise of congressional authority regarding foreign affairs. Justice Anthony Kennedy, Justice Clarence Thomas, Justice Stephen Breyer, Justice Samuel Alito, and Justice Elena Kagan joined the majority opinion (however, Justice Thomas did not join as to Part II-C of the opinion).

The majority began by explaining that judiciary's authority under Article III of the United States Constitution is to "'say what the law is'", quoting Marbury v. Madison (1803). "Congress, no doubt, may not usurp a court's power to interpret and apply the law to the circumstances before it" by, for example, saying in a hypothetical case Smith v. Jones that Smith wins or compelling the courts to reexamine a case after final judgment has been issued.

Bank Markazi relied on United States v. Klein (1871) for much of its argument. In Klein, the Court questioned whether "'the legislature may prescribe rules of decision to the Judicial Department ... in cases pending before it.'" The majority found that "[o]ne cannot take this language from Klein at face value" because the power of Congress to make retroactive laws applicable to pending cases has long been recognized. The majority explained that the contemporary significance of Klein is that "Congress may not exercise its authority, including its power to regulate federal jurisdiction, in a way that requires [federal courts]...to become active participants in violating the Constitution." The unfairness of any retroactive legislation is "'not a sufficient reason for a court to fail to give that law its intended scope.'" The Constitution contains only limited constraints on the enactment of retroactive legislation:

The Ex Post Facto Clause flatly prohibits retroactive application of penal legislation. Article I, §10, cl. 1, prohibits States from passing ... laws 'impairing the Obligation of Contracts.' The Fifth Amendment's Takings Clause prevents the Legislature (and other government actors) from depriving private persons of vested property rights except for a 'public use' and upon payment of 'just compensation.' The prohibitions of 'Bills of Attainder' in Art. I, §§9–10, prohibit legislatures from singling out summary punishment for past conduct. The Due Process Clause also protects the interests in fair notice and repose that may be compromised by retroactive legislation; a justification sufficient to validate a statute's prospective application under the Clause 'may not suffice' to warrant its retroactive application.

— Bank Markazi, slip op. at 16 (2016) (quoting Landgraf v. USI Film Products, 511 U.S. 244, 266–267 (1994))

The majority affirmed that "Congress may indeed direct courts to apply newly enacted, outcome-altering legislation in pending civil cases," citing its previous decisions in Plaut v. Spendthrift Farm, Inc. (1995), Robertson v. Seattle Audubon Society (1992), and Landgraf v. USI Film Products (1994). Accordingly, the majority found that § 8772 "changed the law by establishing new substantive standards"—essentially, that if Iran owns the assets, they would be available for execution against judgments against Iran—for the district court to apply to the case. Section 8772 left several issues for the District Court to adjudicate: it did not define its key terms "beneficial interest" and "equitable title"; whether any other party had a constitutionally protected interest in the account; and whether the assets were "held in the United States" (Clearstream argued the assets were located in Luxembourg, not New York).

The fact that the law only applied to one case does not change its validity, although the majority conceded that a narrowly crafted law affecting just one person or a limited number of people may violate the Equal Protection Clause of the Fourteenth Amendment "if arbitrary or inadequately justified." The federal judiciary has long upheld laws that affect one or a very small number of subjects as a valid exercise of Congress' legislative power, and the Supreme Court upheld a statute that applied to cases identified by docket number in Robertson v. Seattle Audubon Society (1992).

The final portion of the majority's opinion, in which Justice Thomas did not join, upheld § 8772 as a valid exercise of Congress' authority to regulate foreign affairs. Citing Dames & Moore v. Regan (1981), a case which also involved the availability of Iranian assets for execution of judgments against Iran, the majority points out that regulating foreign-state assets—e.g. by blocking them or regulating their availability for execution against judgments—has never been found to violate the judiciary's authority. Prior to the enactment of the Foreign Sovereign Immunities Act (FSIA), the Executive branch routinely made case-specific determinations of the scope of immunity for foreign states. Those decisions were not rejected as infringements on the judiciary's authority. Although the enactment of the FSIA in 1976 transferred authority to the courts to determine foreign-state immunity, the majority held that "it remains Congress' prerogative to alter a foreign state's immunity." When Congress enacted § 8772, it "acted comfortably within the political branches' authority over foreign sovereign immunity and foreign-state assets."

=== Chief Justice Roberts' dissenting opinion ===
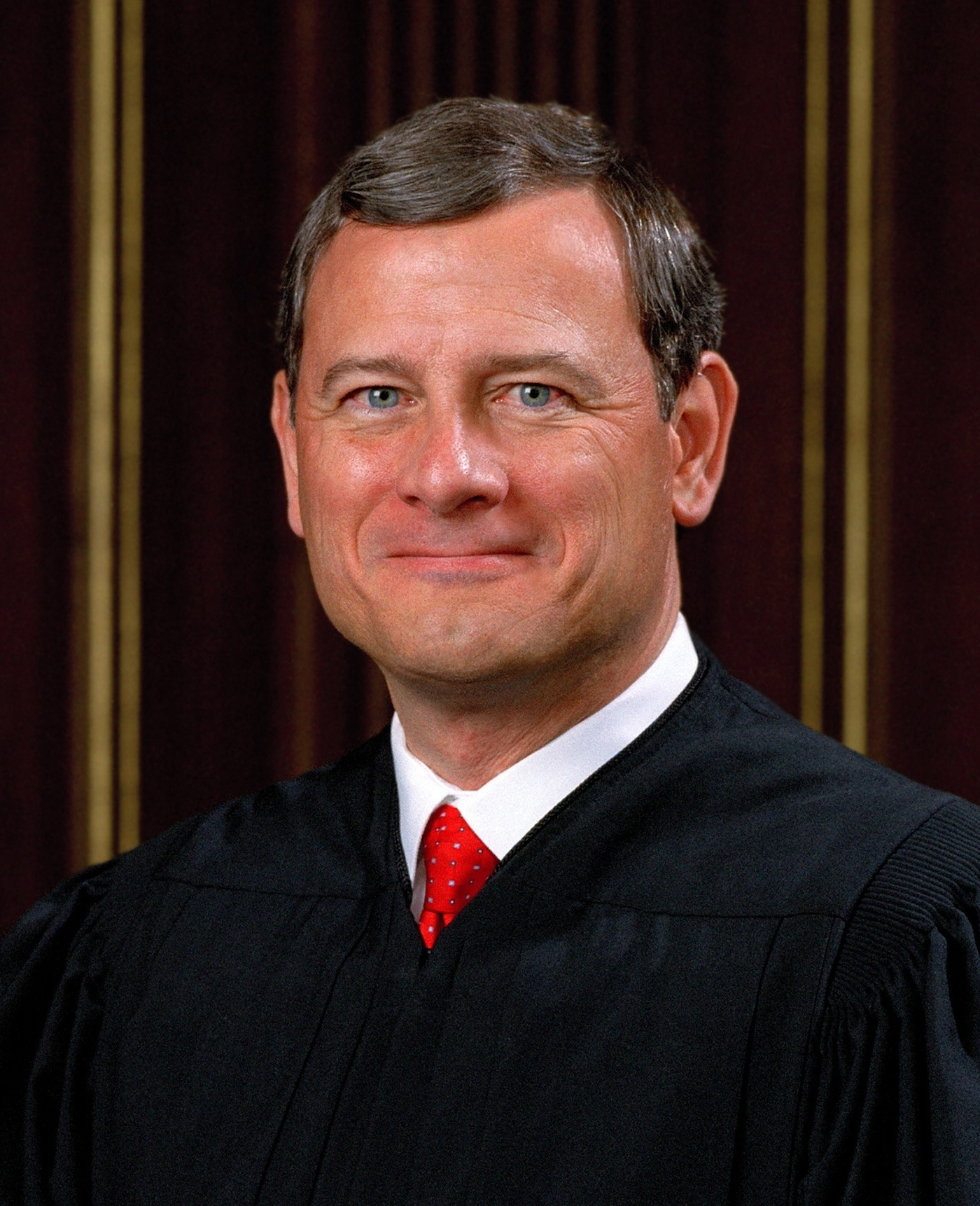
Chief Justice Roberts wrote a dissenting opinion

Chief Justice John Roberts, joined by Justice Sonia Sotomayor, dissented from the majority's ruling. It was the first time that Roberts and Sotomayor were the only two dissenters in a case; they had been on the court together since 2009.

Roberts began his argument with an analogy:

Imagine your neighbor sues you, claiming that your fence is on his property. His evidence is a letter from the previous owner of your home, accepting your neighbor's version of the facts. Your defense is an official county map, which under state law establishes the boundaries of your land. The map shows the fence on your side of the property line. You also argue that your neighbor's claim is six months outside the statute of limitations.

Now imagine that while the lawsuit is pending, your neighbor persuades the legislature to enact a new statute. The new statute provides that for your case, and your case alone, a letter from one neighbor to another is conclusive of property boundaries, and the statute of limitations is one year longer. Your neighbor wins. Who would you say decided your case: the legislature, which targeted your specific case and eliminated your specific defenses so as to ensure your neighbor's victory, or the court, which presided over the fait accompli?

That question lies at the root of the case the Court confronts today.

— Bank Markazi, slip op. at 1 (2016) (Roberts, C.J., dissenting)

In the Chief Justice's view, § 8772 violates the separation of powers in Article III "[n]o less than if [Congress] had passed a law saying 'respondents win.'" The majority responded that a more appropriate analogy to the case is if a legislature enacts a law specifying that a 2000 map supersedes a 1990 map in an ongoing property dispute in which the parties are contesting whether an ambiguous statute makes a 1990 or 2000 county map the authoritative source for establishing property boundaries.

The Chief Justice proceeded to detail the origin, purpose, and case law history of the separation of powers. Article Three of the United States Constitution establishes an independent judiciary with "distinct and inviolable authority." Such separation of powers "safeguards individual freedom." As Alexander Hamilton wrote in Federalist No. 78, quoting Montesquieu, "'there is no liberty if the power of judging be not separated from the legislative and executive powers.'" The separation of powers between the judiciary and legislative branches was examined in detail in Plaut v. Spendthrift Farm, Inc. (1995), in which the Supreme Court found unconstitutional a statute that reopened a case after a final judgment. At the time of the framing of the Constitution, judicial and legislative powers were often intermingled. The colonial legislatures often performed many of the functions of the judiciary, such as functioning as the court of last resort, granting new trials, and providing original review, appellate review, stays of judgments, and providing other types of relief "in an effort to do what is agreeable to Right and Justice." The colonial charters of Massachusetts, Connecticut, and Rhode Island gave the legislatures the authority of court of last resort. In New Hampshire, judicial appeals were directed to the governor and his council, but routinely referred to the legislature for discussion. And for over half a century, the colonial assembly of Virginia could review court judgments. The involvement of legislatures in judicial matters "intensified during the American Revolution," which "soon prompted a sense of a sharp necessity to separate the legislative from the judicial power." The interference of the legislatures in judicial matters "figur[ed] prominently in the Framers' decision to devise a system for securing liberty through the division of power." This resulted in Article Three of the United States Constitution, which forms the "central pillar of judicial independence" and places "'[t]he judicial Power of the United States' ... in 'one supreme Court', and in such 'inferior Courts'" as Congress may establish. This judicial power extends "to all Cases, in Law and Equity, arising under this Constitution, the Laws of the United States, and Treaties made, or which shall be made, under their Authority."

The Chief Justice explained that there are three types of unconstitutional restrictions on the power of the judiciary. "'Congress cannot vest review of the decisions of Article III courts in officials of the Executive Branch'", or "'retroactively command the federal courts to reopen final judgments.'" In the Chief Justice's view, this case is a third type of unconstitutional interference with the judiciary's authority, "whereby Congress assumes the role of judge and decides a particular case in the first instance," which he believes is precisely what § 8772 does. Section 8772 foreclosed Bank Markazi's defenses that it was immune from prosecution under the FSIA, a separate juridical entity under both U.S. federal common law and international law and thus not liable for Iran's debts, and that New York state law did not permit execution of the plaintiff's judgments against its assets. "And lest there be any doubt that Congress' sole concern was deciding this particular case ... § 8772 provided that nothing in the statute 'shall be construed ... to affect the availability, or lack thereof, of a right to satisfy a judgment in any other action against a terrorist party in any proceedings other than' [this case]."

In the hypothetical case of Smith v. Jones in which Congress enacted a statute that says "Smith wins", the majority would find it unconstitutional because it "would create no new substantive law." In the Chief Justice's view, it would: before the passage of the hypothetical statute, the law did not provide that Smith wins; after passage of the hypothetical statute, it does. For the Chief Justice, "the question is whether its action constitutes an exercise of judicial power." Both the hypothetical "Smith wins" statute and § 8772 both have the same effect, which is essentially the legislature's "'policy judgment'" that one side in the case wins. He compared the majority's opinion, which found that § 8772 left plenty of issues for the District Court to adjudicate, to "a constitutional Maginot Line, easily circumvented by the simplest maneuver of taking away every defense against Smith's victory, without saying 'Smith wins.'" Section 8772 only required the courts to make two decisions—that Bank Markazi had an equitable interest in the assets and no one else did—that were both already clear before § 8772 was enacted. By the majority's view of "plenty", the Chief Justice contended that, in the hypothetical case Smith v. Jones, the majority would uphold a judgment for Smith if the court finds that Jones was served notice of the lawsuit and the case was within the statute of limitations. Strongly criticizing the majority, the Chief Justice, quoting Federalist No. 48, concluded that the majority's "failure to enforce [the boundary between the judicial and legislative branches] in a case as clear as this reduces Article III to a mere 'parchment barrier against the encroaching spirit' of legislative power."

Finally, the Chief Justice distinguished this case from Dames & Moore. The actions of the president that Dames & Moore upheld did not dictate the outcome of the case, but merely specified that the claims be handled by a different tribunal. The court's decision in Dames & Moore was based on the "longstanding practice of settling the claims of U.S. nationals against foreign countries by treaty or executive agreement." In contrast with the majority's interpretation of Dames & Moore, "those dispositions, crucially, were not exercises of judicial power." The Chief Justice critiqued the majority's position on Dames & Moore by contending that the political branches of the government—Congress and the executive branch—have sufficient power of their own to address the issues in this case and do not need to "commandeer[] the courts to make a political decision look like a judicial one."

The Chief Justice concluded with a strong criticism of the majority's decision:

At issue here is a basic principle, not a technical rule. Section 8772 decides this case no less certainly than if Congress had directed entry of judgment for respondents. As a result, the potential of the decision today 'to effect important change in the equilibrium of power' is 'immediately evident.' Morrison v. Olson, 487 U.S. 654, 699 (1988) (Scalia, J., dissenting) Hereafter, with this Court's seal of approval, Congress can unabashedly pick the winners and losers in particular pending cases. Today's decision will indeed become a 'blueprint for extensive expansion of the legislative power' at the Judiciary's expense, Metropolitan Washington Airports Authority v. Citizens for Abatement of Aircraft Noise, Inc., 501 U.S. 252, 277 (1991), feeding Congress's tendency to 'extend[] the sphere of its activity and draw[] all power into its impetuous vortex,' The Federalist No. 48 ... (J. Madison)

— Bank Markazi, slip op. at 16–17 (2016) (Roberts, C.J., dissenting)

== Subsequent developments ==
=== Payout to plaintiff-respondents ===
The ruling clears the way for the plaintiff-respondents to collect from the roughly $1.75 billion bank account, which will be enough to satisfy about 70% of their collective $2.5 billion in judgments. They will not be eligible to collect from a $1 billion fund—the Victims of State Sponsored Terrorism Fund—established by Congress in 2015 to pay victims of state-sponsored terrorism. That fund pays 30% of judgments until all applicants have received that amount; remaining funds will not be distributed until all claimants have received 30% of their judgment.

=== Legal community reactions ===
Attorney and law professor Alan Morrison, writing for The George Washington Law Review, remarked that:

To a non-lawyer trying to decide who should win just on the equity, the Bank's chances did not look very good, and on April 20, 2016, the Supreme Court ... upheld the constitutionality of § 8772, thereby removing a major barrier to the victims collecting at least some of their judgments. Those were the atmospherics, but on the legal issues, there was substantial agreement between the two opinions, although in their conclusions they were very far apart. All of the Justices agreed that Congress could pass laws changing the existing law and make those changes generally applicable to pending cases, provided it did so clearly. They also agreed that Congress could not pass a law in a pending case that said something along the lines of, "The Court is directed to enter judgment for the plaintiff," or that "The plaintiff wins and defendant loses." To do so would usurp the judicial role and improperly expand that of Congress. Nor could Congress change the law in a way that re-opened a case in which there was a final judgment not subject to further appeal. There was also agreement that Congress could write laws that applied to a limited category of cases, at least in those cases in which only the Government was adversely affected by the change in the law. The issue here was where § 8772 fell on that spectrum.

Morrison expressed "concern ... that what happened here will repeat itself in other circumstances in which the equities [are] quite different". Although Morrison suggested that an individual aggrieved by such a law could bring a claim for relief under the Equal Protection Clause of the Fourteenth Amendment, he argued that such a claim is unlikely to be successful because the law will likely be upheld when reviewed under the rational basis test. The rational basis test asks "there is some rational relationship between disparity of treatment and some legitimate governmental purpose."

Law professor Evan Zoldan, writing in the Yale Law & Policy Review Inter Alia, noted that the ruling allowed Congress to pick a winner in a particular pending case. He wrote that "By permitting Congress to direct judgment in favor of victims of terrorism, the Bank Markazi Court helped compensate hundreds of people who suffered great tragedies. But, perhaps inadvertently, the Court also conferred on Congress the expansive, and dangerous, power to target an individual for special treatment that is not applied to the population in general."

According to Stuart Newberger, an attorney who represents terror victims, the ruling could hinder foreign governments from using the judiciary to override determinations by Congress and the President regarding the availability of their assets to satisfy judgments against them. Newberger praised the ruling as "a message for any country that if Congress and the president take steps to freeze assets, make assets available to victims, that the courts are going to defer."

=== U.S. reactions ===
The decision was praised in the U.S. by the litigants, their counsel, and politicians. Theodore Olson, counsel for the respondents, praised the ruling, saying it "will bring long-overdue relief to ... victims of Iranian terrorism and their families, many of whom have waited decades for redress." Praising the court's decision, lead plaintiff Deborah Peterson found solace that "in the eyes of the law, we know who is responsible, and those who are responsible have been brought to the justice that we are capable of bringing them to here on earth."

Law professor Jimmy Gurulé said the decision "sends a powerful message to rogue states and state sponsors of terrorism that if you, directly or indirectly, provide material support for terrorism, you will be held accountable"—sentiment echoed by Mark Dubowitz, director of the Foundation for Defense of Democracies—and that "hopefully, it's also going to have a deterrent effect, or least cause Iran to think twice about supporting terrorist activity going forward." The decision was also praised by Senator Bob Menendez, who authored § 8772, and Speaker of the House Paul Ryan.

=== Iranian reactions ===
A spokesman for Iran's Ministry of Foreign Affairs condemned the ruling as "theft", "incompatible with international law", "a ridicule of justice and law" and stated that Iran "totally reject[s]" the ruling. The Iranian Foreign Ministry summoned the Swiss ambassador to Iran, who represents U.S. interests in Iran, to receive diplomatic notes, to be forwarded to the US, protesting the ruling. A week after the decision was announced, Iranian Foreign Minister Mohammad Javad Zarif wrote a letter to Secretary-General of the United Nations Ban Ki-moon urging him to use his good offices to intervene in securing the release of frozen funds and to stop interfering with Iran's international financial transactions. A U.S. State Department spokesman rejected Iran's claims, stating that the State Department "believe[s] the U.S. laws and the application of those laws by the courts of the United States comport with international law."

Iran announced that they would file suit against the United States in the International Court of Justice (ICJ) for reparations if the U.S. courts begin to "plunder" assets from the Citibank account to give to the winning plaintiffs. However, the ICJ may not be able to hear the case. The U.S. withdrew its general recognition of the ICJ's jurisdiction in response to the ICJ's ruling in Nicaragua v. United States, but a 1955 friendship treaty between Iran and the U.S. gives the ICJ jurisdiction to rule on disputes arising from provisions of the treaty. A working group has been established in the Iranian Cabinet to investigate the ruling and determine ways of reestablishing Iran's rights to the account.

Less than a month after the Supreme Court decision, Iran's parliament overwhelmingly approved—181 votes for, 6 votes against, 8 abstentions—an "emergency bill" requiring the government to seek compensation from the U.S. for actions the U.S. has taken against Iran, including the 1953 Iranian coup d'état, which the U.S. helped restore the monarch; the Nojeh coup plot in 1980; United States support for Iraq during the Iran–Iraq war, including compensation for over 800,000 Iranians who died or were injured during the conflict; U.S. espionage in Iran; U.S. support of Israel; the alleged death of 17,000 Iranians at the hands of U.S.-supported terrorist groups; and the confiscation of Iranian assets. The bill requires the government to take "appropriate legal action" for the violation of Iranian state immunity, including the pursuit of U.S. assets in third countries, and to provide regular updates to parliament on its actions against the US.

Some Iranian officials, including the chief of the Central Bank of Iran (CBI), have placed some blame for the Citibank account's seizure on the previous administration of Mahmoud Ahmadinejad, who was president of Iran from 2005 to 2013. The Foreign Ministry's director for political and security affairs, Hamid Baidinejad, said it was "reckless" for the previous administration to have invested in U.S. securities. In a post on the CBI's website, its chief pointed out that: "Although CBI experts and senior officials had warned against investing in dollar denominated securities, the government of president Mahmoud Ahmadinejad went ahead and purchased it, thus paving the way for the damage done to our assets." Hamid Baeidinejad, a senior Foreign Ministry official, criticized the former head of the CBI for investing in a "hostile country".

=== Impact on US-Iran relations ===
The decision came at a delicate time for relations between Iran and Western nations, which were removing sanctions on Iran after its compliance with an agreement for curtailing development of its nuclear enrichment program. The agreement stipulated that once Iranian compliance with the terms of the agreement was verified, most sanctions against Iran would be lifted, including all sanctions imposed by the United Nations Security Council as well as nuclear-related European Union and U.S. sanctions; U.S. sanctions against Iran for terrorism, human rights abuses, and ballistic missiles would not be affected. In mid-January 2016, most sanctions were lifted. In March, the District Court for the Southern District of New York found, by default, that Iran had provided support to certain terrorist groups and individuals responsible for the September 11 attacks and awarded $10.5 billion in damages to the plaintiffs, which consisted of $3 billion to reimburse insurance companies for paid claims and $7.5 billion for victims and their families ($2 million for pain and suffering and $6.88 million in punitive damages per victim). The same judge ruled just six months earlier that there was insufficient evidence linking Saudi Arabia—which has sour relations with Iran—to the 9/11 attacks to overcome, under the terrorism exemption, Saudi Arabia's immunity under the FSIA.

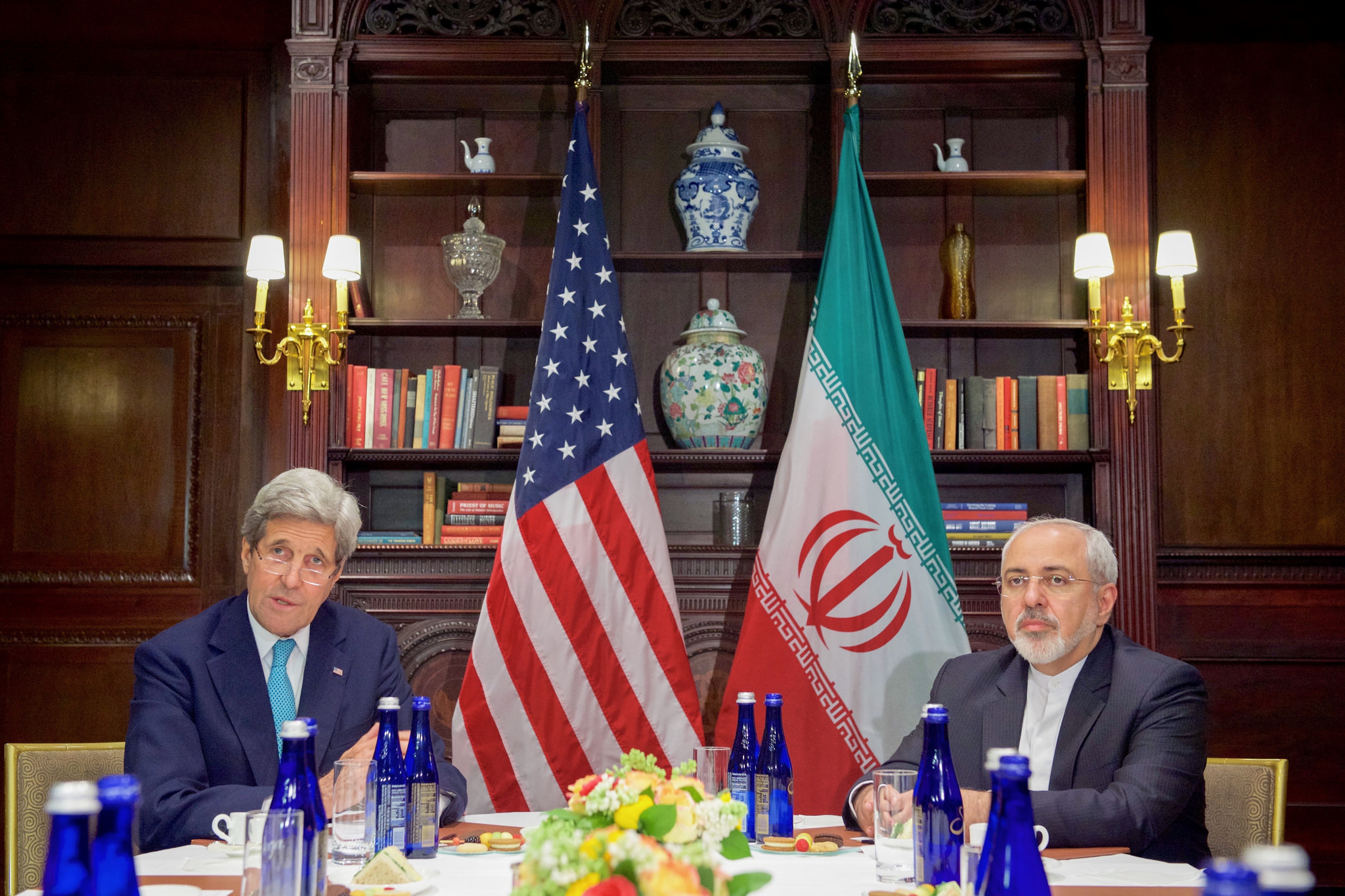
Secretary of State John Kerry meeting with Iranian Foreign Minister Mohammad Javad Zarif two days after the Supreme Court's decision was released

The Supreme Court's decision was announced while Iran's Foreign Minister, Mohammad Javad Zarif, was visiting the United States. The week before the decision was announced, the head of the Central Bank of Iran had visited Washington, during the spring meetings of the World Bank and International Monetary Fund, to discuss with U.S. and foreign officials problems that remained with Iranian access to international banking, despite the lifting of sanctions. Javad Zarif criticized the Bank Markazi decision and the "even more absurd" 9/11 decision by the New York as "the height of absurdity". Iranian President Hassan Rouhani called the decisions "open hostility by the United States against the Iranian people."

Under the nuclear agreement, an important policy objective was to ensure that the Iranian economy benefits from suspending its nuclear weapons program. In the view of commentators Ali Omidi, a professor of international relations at the University of Isfahan, and Saam Borhani, an attorney and commentator on US-Iran relations and sanctions law, the Bank Markazi decision and the 9/11 case threaten to undermine the nuclear deal and American credibility in negotiations with Iran. The head of the Nuclear Committee in Iran's parliament, Ibrahim Karkhaneh, decried the rulings as "cooperation between the American Congress, the government and courts to steal Iranian property."

== See also ==
- Certain Iranian Assets – ICJ case filed by Iran against the US as a result of this case
- Iran–United States relations
- University of Chicago Persian antiquities crisis
