= Executive Order 12170 =

1979 US presidential order freezing all Iranian government assets in the US

Executive Order 12170 was issued by American president Jimmy Carter on November 14, 1979, ten days after the Iran hostage crisis had started. The executive order, empowered under the International Emergency Economic Powers Act, ordered the freezing of all Iranian government assets held within the United States.

The release of the US hostages, as well as the unfreezing of Iranian assets and establishing arbitration for resolving claims on both sides was negotiated in the Algiers Accords; the accords were signed on the last full day of the Carter administration and assented to by the incoming Reagan Administration.

The order was first declared on 14 November 1979 (EO 12170). At least 11 executive orders were based on this emergency state. The emergency, which was renewed in 2023 for the 44th time, is the "oldest existing state of emergency." The renewal of the emergency state with respect to Iran was equal to continuation of non-nuclear US sanctions against Iran.

By 2014, this state of emergency was among 30 others which US was dealing with. According to Gregory Korte of USA Today, this state of emergency gives "extra ordinary powers" to the president to "seize property, call up the National Guard and hire and fire military officers at will," since it is declared by executive order. The language of such declarations are "nearly apocalyptic," according to the USA Today. Although bound by law to review the emergence declarations, Congress provides little "oversight" on them, said Korte.

== Renewals ==
=== 2016 ===
By 2016 (the year the Joint Comprehensive Plan of Action was implemented), some of the executive orders issued pursuant to the declared national emergency were terminated. However, the situation was extended by President Barack Obama for an additional year, as he believed that US relations with Iran had not yet returned to normal, and the process of implementing the agreements with Iran, dated Jan. 19, 1981, Algiers Accords, had not been fully implanted. "Despite the historic deal to ensure the exclusively peaceful nature of Iran's nuclear program, certain actions and policies of the Government of Iran continue to pose an unusual and extraordinary threat to the national security, foreign policy, and economy of the United States," wrote Obama in his letter to the Congress.

Most of the U.S. sanctions against Iran are legally originated from this state of emergency. This renewal meant that "non-nuclear US sanctions against Iran will remain in effect for at least another year."

=== 2017 ===
On November 6, 2017, President Donald Trump extended the national emergency for another year and wrote a letter to Congress.

== See also ==
- Dames & Moore v. Regan
- List of national emergencies in the United States
- Jimmy Carter's engagement with Ruhollah Khomeini
