= Heidelberg University Faculty of Law =

Faculty of the Heidelberg University

Coordinates: 49.4075°N 8.6956°E

- Type: public
- Established: 1386; 640 years ago
- Dean: Ekkehard Reimer
- Students: 2.952 (2018)
- Location: Heidelberg, BW, Germany
- Campus: urban
- Website: http://www.jura.uni-heidelberg.de/

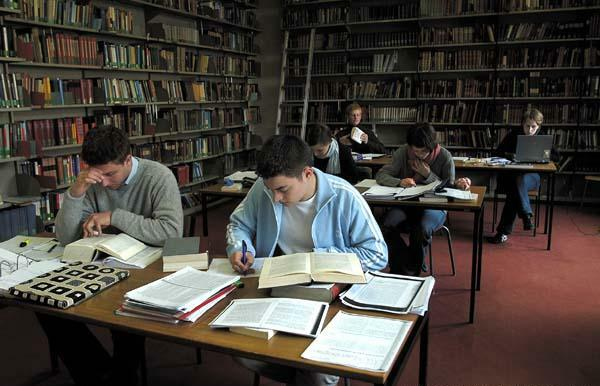
Heidelberg Law Library (2004)

The Heidelberg University Faculty of Law (also known as Heidelberg Law School), located in Heidelberg, Germany, is one of the original four constituent faculties of Heidelberg University. Founded in 1386 by Rupert I, Elector Palatine, it is the oldest law school in Germany.

== Academics ==
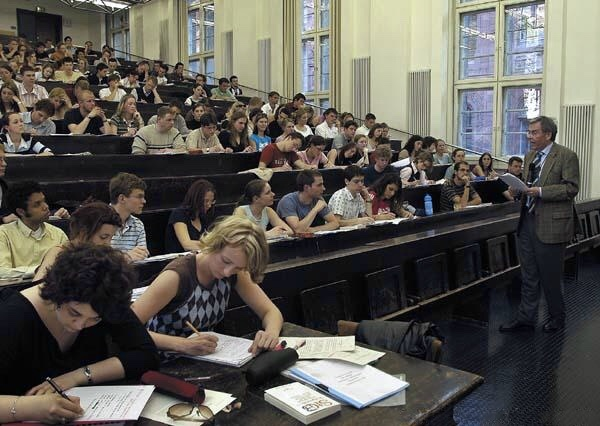
A lecture at law (2004)

Besides the first professional degree in law, and various doctoral programs, the school offers a general Master of Laws (LL.M.) program for foreign-educated lawyers, a specialized LL.M. in corporate restructuring, as well as a specialized LL.M. in international law, the latter being offered exclusively at the Heidelberg Center in Santiago, Chile. Teaching is delivered through lectures, tutorials, moot courts and seminars. The school also runs the Max Planck Research School for Successful Dispute Resolution in International Law in cooperation with the Max Planck Institute for International Law.

Law students have to cover a wide range of compulsory subjects. After the intermediate examination, they can choose one of eleven elective subjects ("Schwerpunktbereiche"), in Heidelberg: legal history and historical comparative law; criminal law and criminology; German and European administrative law; labor law and social legislation; tax law; business law; commercial law and European Community law; civil procedure; conflict of laws; public international law; Healthcare law.

Thomas Lobinger and the exam preparation course "HeidelPräp!" won the Ars legendi-Award 2014 for excellence in higher education didactics, donated by Stifterverband für die Deutsche Wissenschaft and German Rectors' Conference.

Heidelberg is home of Germany's oldest student law review "StudZR".

The main research interests of the faculty center around the harmonisation of private and public law at a European and international level; the ongoing refinement and adaptation of commercial, fiscal and labor legislation; the design of a legal framework for dealing with issues posed by statehood and European and global transnationality; criminology; and the history of law.

== Reputation and admission ==
University rankings

By subject – Global & National
QS Law 2022	=62	3

CHE Ranking 2020 – National
Law
Overall study situation	● 2.8
Support in the study entry phase	● 9/12 pts.
Teacher support	● 2.9
Exam preparation	● 7/10 pts.

For centuries Heidelberg has been one of the preeminent law schools in Germany, today regularly placing at or near the top of various German law school rankings.

In the 2022 QS World University Rankings by subjects Heidelberg Law ranks 62 globally, down from rank 24 in 2014. It is ranked third in Germany after the University of Bonn and LMU Munich. In the 2020 CHE University Ranking, Heidelberg University is in the top group with regard to support in the study entry phase and doctorates per professor.

The school accepts less than one in ten applicants for the first professional degree program, and consistently has the highest number of applicants per place of all German law schools. Admission decisions for the first professional degree course are based on the Abitur GPA; the Abitur grades in German, mathematics, and in the first foreign language; as well as on other individual merits. Admission to graduate degrees is based on the results of the previous law degree and if applying for doctoral studies, the candidate's demonstrated capacity to pursue independently original research.

== Statistics ==
The school comprises 2.764 students, including 2.396 students pursuing the first legal examination, 241 doctoral students and 96 Master of Laws students. Ten percent of the student body are international students. As of 2014, the law school's faculty consists of 62 full professors, excluding assistant professors, graduate research and teaching assistants, adjunct faculty, and visiting scholars. In 2012, the school raised 790,000 EUR in third-party funds. In Germany, regularly thirty percent of the candidates fail the First Legal Examination, and only 10 percent achieve a distinction. At Heidelberg Law School, the failure rate is only 20 percent and more than 20 percent graduate with distinction in the statewide final exam.

== International cooperations ==
The school has student exchange agreements and research cooperations with some 40 partner universities, and it has established a professorial exchange program with the Georgetown University Law Center. In addition, it co-runs the School of German Law at the Jagiellonian University of Kraków, and it is actively involved in the development of the German-speaking Andrássy University of Budapest.

== Noted people ==
Among the school's noted alumni in government are three Chancellors of Germany, a Prime Minister of Belgium and Nobel Peace Laureate, a Prime Minister of Bulgaria, a Prince Regent of Thailand, a Secretary General of NATO, two Federal Ministers of Justice, a Federal Minister of the Interior, a Federal Minister of Defense, a Federal Minister of Education and Research, and two Nazi-era ministers. Besides numerous Federal Judges, alumni in judiciary include 17 Justices of the Federal Constitutional Court of Germany including three vice presidents of the court, a President of the International Court of Justice, two Presidents of the European Court of Human Rights, a President of the Federal Court of Justice of Germany, a President of the Federal Labor Court of Germany, a Vice President of the International Criminal Court, two Vice Presidents of the OSCE Court of Conciliation and Arbitration, two Attorneys General of Germany, an Advocate General at the European Court of Justice, a Justice in the Supreme Court of the Philippines, and a British Law Lord. Other famous alumni include the national poet of Pakistan Sir Muhammad Iqbal and classical composer Robert Schumann.

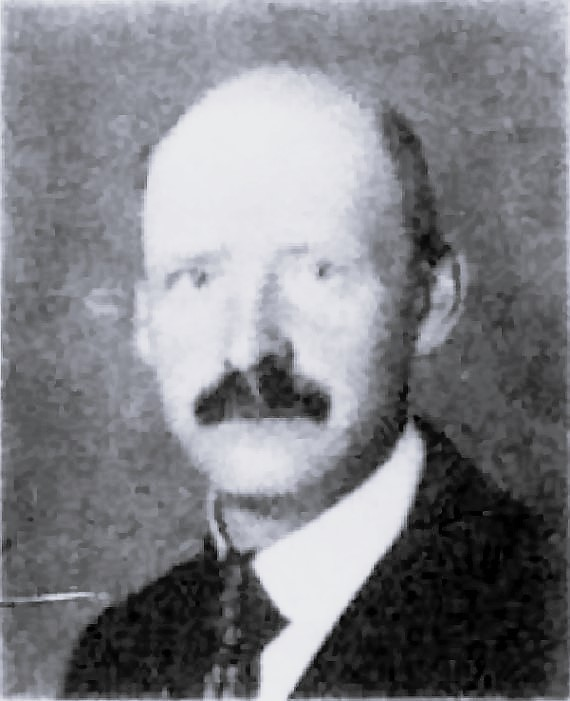
Gustav Radbruch

Among the Heidelberg law scholars in the 19th and 20th centuries were Anton Friedrich Justus Thibaut, Bernhard Windscheid, Johann Caspar Bluntschli, Georg Jellinek, Otto von Gierke, Gerhard Anschütz and Gustav Radbruch. The law school's present professors include former Justice of the Federal Constitutional Court of Germany Paul Kirchhof, former President of the International Tribunal for the Law of the Sea Rüdiger Wolfrum, former Secretary General of UNIDROIT and sitting chairman in the Iran–United States Claims Tribunal Herbert Kronke, and sitting President of the European Nuclear Energy Tribunal Armin von Bogdandy. Also, many Heidelberg law professors frequently act as consultants to the Federal Government, the Federal Parliament, the European Commission, and to the highest national and international courts. Sitting Justices of the Federal Constitutional Court of Germany Ferdinand Kirchhof, Johannes Masing, Rudolf Mellinghoff, and Lerke Osterloh have served as lecturers and researchers in the school prior to their appointment to the court.

== In fiction and popular culture ==
In Bernhard Schlink's semi-autobiographical 1995 novel The Reader, Heidelberg University is one of the main scenes of Part II. Nearly a decade after his affair with an older woman came to a mysterious end, Michael Berg, a law student at the university, re-encounters his former lover as she defends herself in a war-crimes trial, which he observes as part of a seminar. The university is also featured in the Academy Award-winning 2008 film version The Reader, starring Kate Winslet, David Kross and Ralph Fiennes.

Heidelberg university is featured in Naoki Urasawa's 1994–2001 manga series, Monster, and its subsequent 2004–2005 anime adaptation, wherein it is featured as the university Nina Fortner (Anna Liebert) is attending to get her degree in law. By the end of the series, despite the turmoil she's faced and her professor's initial displeasure at her consistent tardiness, she graduates with her degree.

In Michel Favart's film «Les Alsaciens ou les Deux Mathilde», Karl Kempf, one of the main characters, studies law at Heidelberg university, while his brother Edouard begins his studies at the École Polytechnique in France.

Hans Julius Grebenar is a law graduate of Heidelberg university in Jeffrey Archer's short story "A good eye" of the collection And Thereby Hangs a Tale, as well as the East Prussian Junker (Prussia) Count Rudolf von Adelhaus in Harold Spender's 1916 Novel "The Dividing Sword".

== See also ==
- Heidelberg University, General Presentation
- Max Planck Institute for Comparative Public Law and International Law
- Studentische Zeitschrift für Rechtswissenschaft Heidelberg
