= Charles N. Brower =

American judge

The Honorable Charles N. Brower

Judge of the Iran-United States Claims Tribunal
- In office 1983–2015
- Succeeded by: David D. Caron

Judge ad hoc of the International Court of Justice
- In office 2014–2022

Personal details
- Occupation: Judge

Charles N. Brower is a former State Department official, international judge, and recognized expert in public international law and international dispute resolution. He has been a judge of the Iran–United States Claims Tribunal since 1983. He has also served as a Judge ad hoc in three cases before the International Court of Justice (ICJ) since 2014. He is currently affiliated with 20 Essex Street Chambers in London, UK.

Brower was educated at Harvard College (B.A., 1957) and Harvard Law School (J.D., 1961).

He began his career as an attorney in private practice from 1961–1968 with the law firm of White & Case LLP. He then served in various roles in the U.S. Government, including the U.S. Department of State. He served as Assistant Legal Adviser for European Affairs (1969–1971); Deputy Legal Adviser (1971-1972); and Acting Legal Adviser (1973), leading the Office of the Legal Adviser. During this period, he was also Member, Joint U.S.-U.S.S.R. Commercial Commission (1972-1973). He later served as Deputy Special Counsellor to the President of the United States (1987), with sub-Cabinet rank as Deputy Assistant to the President. He then returned to White & Case and co-founded its Washington, D.C., office in 1988.

Brower has served since 1983 as a judge of the Iran-United States Claims Tribunal in The Hague, The Netherlands, where he was a full-time member from 1984 to 1988. Since 2014, Brower has also been judge ad hoc of the International Court of Justice. As of October 2023 he is a judge in two active cases by appointment of the United States:

- The Case Concerning Certain Iranian Assets (Islamic Republic of Iran v United States of America): serving as judge ad hoc (2016-current).
- The Case Concerning Alleged Violations of the 1955 Treaty of Amity, Economic Relations, and Consular Rights (Islamic Republic of Iran v United States of America): serving as judge ad hoc (2018–current).

He also was a judge ad hoc of the International Court of Justice in a case by appointment of Colombia until he resigned on 5 June 2022:

- Question of the Delimitation of the Continental Shelf Between Nicaragua and Colombia Beyond 200 Nautical Miles from the Nicaraguan Coast (Nicaragua v Colombia): serving as judge ad hoc (2014–2022).

Brower has served also as a judge ad hoc of other international judicial panels, such as the Inter-American Court of Human Rights; as a member of the Register of Experts of the United Nations Compensation Commission in Geneva (UNCC); and as a member of the Panel of Arbitrators of the International Centre for Settlement of Investment Disputes (ICSID).

Brower has been a visiting fellow at Jesus College, Cambridge and a distinguished visiting professor at the University of Virginia Law School.
