= David Caron =

American attorney (1953–2018)

David D. Caron
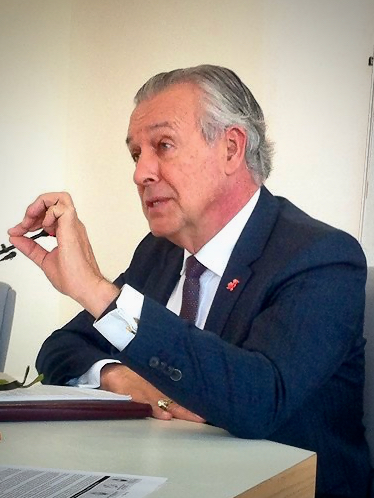

Judge of the Iran-United States Claims Tribunal
- In office 2015 – 2018 (death)
- Preceded by: Charles N. Brower
- Succeeded by: Sir Christopher Greenwood

Judge ad hoc of the International Court of Justice
- In office 2014 – 2018 (death)

Personal details
- Born: 28 June 1953 Connecticut, United States
- Died: 20 February 2018 (aged 64) London, England
- Education: United States Coast Guard Academy, University of Wales, University of California, Berkeley, Leiden University
- Occupation: Professor, Judge

David D. Caron (28 June 1952 – 20 February 2018) was an American attorney who was the dean of the King's College London School of Law, and an emeritus professor of UC Berkeley School of Law. Caron was a Member of the Iran-United States Claims Tribunal and a Judge ad hoc of the International Court of Justice. After his death it was said that "at (his) prime, (he) was arguably one of the top two or three arbitrators in the United States and in the world."

Berkeley Law Dean Erwin Chemerinsky said that Caron "wrote on virtually every aspect of international law, looking especially at public and private international dispute resolution and international courts and tribunals" He also credited Caron with being a "pioneer in the field of international environmental law, looking at issues such as the law of the sea and climate change."

== Biography ==
=== Early life ===
Caron was born in Connecticut. He was the youngest of three siblings. His parents were emigrants from Quebec, Canada. While in school Caron undertook summer work in tobacco fields outside of Hartford, Connecticut. He graduated from A.J. Penney High School in East Hartford and applied to join the United States Coast Guard Academy after high school. His first application was rejected on medical grounds, and he had to have surgery to break and reset his jaw, to meet the admission criteria. Caron's dental surgeon wrote to the Coast Guard about the “remarkable stoicism which underscored his determination to qualify as a Cadet at the Academy”.

=== Education ===
At the United States Coast Guard Academy, Caron took physics and political science as his major. He was Commander of the Corps of Cadets in 1974. He was an Arctic navigator and salvage-diving officer aboard the US Coast Guard cutter Polar Star. In San Francisco he was assistant chief of the Marine Environment Protection Service for California.

Next, in 1979, Caron studied at the University of Wales in Cardiff on a Fulbright Commission scholarship. He then studied law at the University of California, Berkeley. When asked, later, about his decision to study law, he said: "I discovered I loved learning and I was just insatiable about it and still am in many ways. I moved from studying how things work to why people don't work – and how you could help them." While a legal assistant at the Iran-U.S. Claims Tribunal Caron undertook a PhD in law at Leiden University.

=== Professor of Law ===
Caron's first position after law school was as a legal assistant at the Iran-U.S. Claims Tribunal for both Judges Richard M. Mosk and Charles N. Brower.

Upon his return to California, Caron briefly worked as an attorney, before he became a faculty member at Berkley Law School in 1987. He would remain in the faculty, first as C. William Maxeiner Distinguished Professor of International Law, and later as professor emeritus, for the rest of his life. He received the 1991 Deak Prize of the American Society of International Law for outstanding scholarship by a younger academic. In 2000, Caron received the first Stefan A. Riesenfeld Award. The award recognizes outstanding contributions to international law. In 2010-2012 he was the President of the American Society of International Law.

Between 2013 and 2016 he served as Dean of the law school at King's College London. Caron left this position to take up membership of the Iran-U.S. Claims Tribunal, while he kept his links to the law schools in Berkeley and London.

=== Arbitrator & Judge ===
Caron served as counsel, and at times as an expert, before international courts and tribunals. In the former role, he became a barrister, and member of 20 Essex Chambers in London.

Caron then built up his extensive expertise as an international arbitrator, including as a Commissioner with the Precedent Panel of the U. N. Compensation Commission in Geneva that resolved claims from the 1990 Gulf War.

=== Death ===
Caron died at St. Thomas' Hospital, London, on 20 February 2018 after a short illness. Only three days before he had been sitting as a Judge at the Iran-U.S. Claims Tribunal.

== Legacy ==
On 23 March 2018, a “packed service of celebration and thanksgiving for his life” was held at The Honourable Society of the Inner Temple in London. The memorial host was Baroness Rosalyn Higgins, a former Treasurer of the Inn, and former President of the International Court of Justice

The American Society of International Law dedicated its 112th Annual Meeting, held from 4–7 April 2018, to Caron's memory. The Society later announced a fund in Caron's honour, the David D. Caron Fund, which would support the activities of young scholars and, in particular, the Society's Mid-Year Meeting.

On 14–15 September 2018, UC Berkeley School of Law held a memorial and conference in Caron's honor. The conference was on the theme “The Elegance of International Law”. The proceedings of the conference were jointly published by the Berkeley Journal of International Law and the Ecology Law Quarterly, with both of which Caron had strong ties.

In 2024 Oxford University Press published a collection of essays by judges, arbitrators, lawyers, and academics in Caron's honour. Entitled By Peaceful Means: International Adjudication and Arbitration - Essays in Honour of David D. Caron, the volume was edited by then ICJ President, Joan Donoghue, as well as Judge Charles N. Brower, Cian C. Murphy, Cymie R. Payne, and Esmé R. Shirlow. The book was launched at the 2024 Annual Meeting of the American Society of International Law.

== Publications ==
=== Books ===
Caron's books include the following:

- The International Law of Disaster Relief (editor with Michael J. Kelly, Anastasia Telesetsky), 2016, Cambridge University Press.
- Practising Virtue: Inside International Arbitration (editor with Stephan W. Schill, Abby Cohen Smutny, and Epaminotas E. Triantafilou), 2015, Oxford University Press.
- The Oceans on the Nuclear Age: Legacies and Risks, Second Expanded Edition (editor with Narry N. Scheiber), 2014, Brill Nijhoff.
- The UNCITRAL Arbitration Rules: A Commentary (author with Lee M. Caplan), 2013, Oxford University Press.

=== Articles ===
Caron's articles include the following:

- 'The Alien Tort Statute: An Overview of Current Issues' (2010) 28 Berkeley Journal of International Law (with Richard M. Buxbaum)
- 'The ILC Articles on State Responsibility: The Paradoxical Relationship between Form and Authority' (2002) 96(4) The American Journal of International Law 857
- 'War and International Adjudication: Reflections on the 1899 Peace Conference' (2000) 94(1) American Journal of International Law 4
- 'The legitimacy of the collective authority of the Security Council' (1995) 87(4) American Journal of International Law 552
- 'The International Whaling Commission and the North Atlantic Marine Mammal Commission: The Institutional Risks of Coercion in Consensual Structures' (1995) 89(1) The American Journal of International Law 154
- 'The Legitimacy of the Collective Authority of the Security Council' (1993) 87(4) American Journal of International Law 552
- 'Iraq and the Force of Law: Why Give a Shield of Immunity?' (1991) 85(1) The American Journal of International Law 89

=== Lectures ===
- Fifth Annual Charles N. Brower Lecture on International Dispute Resolution: The Multiple Functions of International Courts and the Singular Task of the Adjudicator, American Society of International Law, 2017.
- Understanding Why International Courts and Tribunals Look and Act as They Do, for the UN Audio Visual Library.
