= Parsian Enghelab Hotel =

Hotel in Tehran, Iran

- Interactive map of the Parsian Enghelab Hotel area
- Hotel chain: Parsian Hotels

General information
- Location: Tehran, Iran
- Coordinates: 35.7072°N 51.4086°E
- Opening: 1977
- Management: Parsian International Hotels Co.

Technical details
- Floor count: 16
- Floor area: 5,800 m2

Other information
- Number of rooms: 250
- Number of restaurants: 2

Website
- http://enghelab.pih.ir/

The Parsian Enghelab Hotel is a 250-room hotel in Tehran, Iran.

== History ==
The Royal Gardens Hotel opened in 1977. It was constructed by the prominent Iranian Jewish Berookhim family. The hotel's design was intended to reflect a Persian Garden. With the outbreak of the Iranian Revolution, the Royal Gardens Hotel was badly damaged by rioting mobs on November 5, 1978. The hotel was expropriated from the Berookhim family along with their other holdings in November 1979, and a member of the family, Ebrahim Berookhim, was executed by the revolutionary government in August 1980. The family filed a claim against the Iranian government with the Iran–United States Claims Tribunal for both actions.

After its expropriation, the hotel was renamed the Enghelab Hotel (meaning "Revolution" Hotel in Persian). It later become managed by the state-run Parsian International Hotels Co.

== Facilities ==
The hotel has 2 restaurants one of which revolves.
