= International Emergency Economic Powers Act =

United States federal law

- Long title: An Act with respect to the powers of the President in time of war or national emergency.
- Acronyms (colloquial): IEEPA
- Enacted by: the 95th United States Congress
- Effective: December 28, 1977

Citations
- Public law: 95-223
- Statutes at Large: 91 Stat. 1625

Codification
- Titles amended: 50 U.S.C.: War and National Defense
- U.S.C. sections created: 50 U.S.C. ch. 35 § 1701 et seq.

Legislative history
- Introduced in the House as H.R. 7738 by Jonathan Brewster Bingham (D–NY) on June 13, 1977; Committee consideration by House Foreign Affairs, Senate Banking, Housing, and Urban Affairs; Passed the House on July 12, 1977 (passed); Passed the Senate on October 11, 1977 (passed) with amendment; House agreed to Senate amendment on November 30, 1977 (agreed) with further amendment; Senate agreed to House amendment on December 7, 1977 (agreed); Signed into law by President Jimmy Carter on December 28, 1977

United States Supreme Court cases
- Dames & Moore v. Regan, 453 U.S. 654 (1981); Learning Resources, Inc. v. Trump (2026)

The International Emergency Economic Powers Act (IEEPA), Title II of Pub. L. 95–223, 91 Stat. 1626, enacted December 28, 1977, is a United States federal law authorizing the president to regulate international commerce after declaring a national emergency in response to any unusual and extraordinary threat to the United States which has its source in whole or substantial part outside the United States. The act was signed by President Jimmy Carter on December 28, 1977.

== Provisions ==
In the United States Code, the IEEPA is Title 50, §§1701–1707. The IEEPA authorizes the president to declare the existence of an "unusual and extraordinary threat ... to the national security, foreign policy, or economy of the United States" that originates "in whole or substantial part outside the United States." It further authorizes the president, after such a declaration, to block transactions and freeze assets to deal with the threat and requires the president to report to Congress every 6 months on the circumstances, threats and actions taken. In the event of an actual attack on the United States, the president can also confiscate property connected with a country, group, or person that aided in the attack.

IEEPA falls under the provisions of the National Emergencies Act (NEA), which means that an emergency declared under the act must be renewed annually to remain in effect.

The authority given to the president under the IEEPA does not grant him the ability to regulate or prohibit communication that "does not involve a transfer of anything of value", imports or exports of information or any informational materials, or transactions incidental to travel. Donations intended to relieve human suffering, such as food, clothing or medicine are also excluded unless the president specifically finds their inclusion necessary.

== History ==
=== Curtailment of emergency executive powers ===
Congress enacted the IEEPA in 1977 to clarify and restrict presidential power during times of declared national emergency under the Trading with the Enemy Act of 1917 ("TWEA"). Under TWEA, starting with Franklin D. Roosevelt in 1933, presidents had the power to declare emergencies without limiting their scope or duration, without citing the relevant statutes, and without congressional oversight. The Supreme Court in Youngstown Sheet & Tube Co. v. Sawyer limited what a president could do in such an emergency, but did not limit the emergency declaration power itself. A 1973 Senate investigation found (in Senate Report 93-549) that four declared emergencies remained in effect: the 1933 banking crisis with respect to the hoarding of gold, a 1950 emergency with respect to the Korean War, a 1970 emergency regarding the postal workers strike, and a 1971 emergency in response to the government's deteriorating economic and fiscal conditions. Congress terminated these emergencies with the National Emergencies Act, and then passed the IEEPA to restore the emergency power in a limited, overseeable form.

Unlike TWEA, IEEPA was drafted to permit presidential emergency declarations only in response to threats originating outside the United States. Beginning with Jimmy Carter in response to the Iran Hostage Crisis, presidents have invoked IEEPA to safeguard U.S. national security interests by freezing or "blocking" assets of belligerent foreign governments, or certain foreign nationals abroad.

In 1988, Congress passed amendments to the TWEA and IEEPA, authored by Rep. Howard Berman (D–CA), aimed at protecting the rights of American citizens to receive information, regardless of the country of origin of such materials used, by exempting varied methods of communication from regulation. The revisions to both acts, known collectively as the "Berman Amendment", restrict the president's authority to regulate or prohibit the importation or exportation of various forms of print, audio and video materials, artwork and other images, and other informational materials protected under the First Amendment. The Office of Foreign Assets Control (OFAC) under the U.S. Department of Treasury, however, interpreted this exemption narrowly to claim it held the right to prohibit any transactions associated with "informational materials not fully created and in existence at the date of the transaction". In response, the Berman-sponsored Free Trade in Ideas Act—passed by Congress in 1994—revised the original amendment's First Amendment exemptions to include newer and forthcoming mediums (including intangible items such as television broadcasts and methods of personal communication), further clarifying that the president's emergency sanction powers under the IEEPA and TWEA cannot be used with regard to any information or informational materials, regardless of their format or medium, or whether they are intended for personal or commercial use. The updated language also clarified that the non-exhaustive list of exempted materials was illustrative in nature, inferring that unlisted materials not yet invented or in wide use at the time of its passage would be prohibited from being subject to sanctions or other regulation under both acts.

=== 9/11 response ===
Following the September 11, 2001, terrorist attacks, President George W. Bush issued Executive Order 13224 under the IEEPA to block the assets of terrorist organizations. The president delegated blocking authority to federal agencies led by the U.S. Treasury. In October 2001, Congress passed the USA PATRIOT Act which, in part, enhanced IEEPA asset blocking provisions under §1702(a)(1)(B) to permit the blocking of assets during the "pendency of an investigation." This statutory change gave the Treasury's Office of Foreign Assets Control the power to block assets without the need to provide evidence of the blocking subject's wrongdoing nor to permit the blocking subject a chance to effectively respond to the allegations in court. Executing these blocking actions led to a series of legal cases challenging federal authority to indefinitely prevent charitable organizations from accessing their assets held in the United States.

=== Trump administrations ===
President Donald Trump used the IEEPA extensively, sanctioning more than 3,700 entities and invoking 11 national emergency declarations (out of the 13 that he declared overall) relying primarily or exclusively on IEEPA authority during his 2017–21 term; Trump also used or threatened use of its powers in unconventional and unprecedented manners (including executive actions utilizing powers under the act that prompted legal challenges).

On May 30, 2019, the White House announced that Trump would use IEEPA powers to introduce tariffs on imports from Mexico in response to the national security threat of illegal immigration from Mexico into the United States. As part of an ongoing trade war with China, on August 24, 2019, Trump tweeted that he "hereby ordered" U.S. companies to start looking at alternatives to China on the basis of claimed powers under IEEPA. Trump, however, did not formally declare an emergency as required by IEEPA.

In September 2020, the Trump administration sanctioned and imposed visa restrictions on two International Criminal Court (ICC) officials, prosecutor Fatou Bensouda and Jurisdiction Complementarity and Cooperation Division Director Phakiso Mochochoko, over the court's investigation into allegations of war crimes committed by the U.S. and Israel in Afghanistan and the Palestinian territories, respectively. Critics considered the order an effort to intimidate ICC civil servants from proceeding with its investigation and accused the administration of targeting the two prosecutors, both of African origin, based on their race. The U.S. District Court for the Southern District of New York granted a preliminary injunction blocking the sanctions in January 2021, through a challenge to the order brought by four dual-national American law professors and the Open Society Justice Initiative. (The Biden administration lifted the ICC sanctions in April 2021.)

Also in September 2020, Trump used the IEEPA to order the removal of social media platforms TikTok and WeChat from U.S. app stores as well as prohibit domestic business transactions involving their respective China-based parent companies ByteDance and Tencent; the restrictions would have become applicable to TikTok unless it was sold to an American company within 45 days of the executive order's issuance. Observers (including Trump administration critics and many TikTok users) raised First Amendment concerns with the executive order and suggested that, while national security concerns were cited to justify them, the sanctions were prompted by the administration's hostile relations toward China in general and retaliation against TikTok in particular. This retaliation was claimed to be for certain anti-Trump content hosted by the app. The app's operator suggested in court documents pertaining to its lawsuit to overturn the order that the retaliation was also for a ticket reservation prank waged by some users of the video platform that depressed attendance for a campaign rally he held in Tulsa, Oklahoma, that June. The executive order was blocked by federal courts in two separate cases on grounds that the sanctions likely violated IEEPA's informational materials exemption (under the Berman Amendment) and First Amendment protections applying to users of the apps.

In February 2026, the Supreme Court held that the IEEPA did not authorize the president to set tariffs in Learning Resources, Inc. v. Trump. This decision reversed the tariffs implemented by Trump under IEEPA during his second term. Consequently, U.S. Customs established a new process—the Consolidated Administration & Processing of Entries (CAPE) system—to refund importers for voided IEEPA duties.

== Litigation ==
=== Notable cases ===
- Dames & Moore v. Regan
- KindHearts for Charitable Humanitarian Development v. Geithner
- Genova Pipe v. Lutnick and Noem
- Learning Resources, Inc. v. Trump, and Trump v. V.O.S. Selections, Inc.
- Nintendo of America Inc. v. U.S. Department of the Treasury

=== Violations ===
- In 1983, financier Marc Rich was accused of violating the act by trading in Iranian oil during the Iran hostage crisis. He was one of many people pardoned by President Bill Clinton in his last days in office.
- On August 23, 2006, Javed Iqbal was arrested through the U.S. Department of the Treasury with a charge of conspiracy to violate the IEEPA for airing material produced by al-Manar (The Beacon) in New York City during the 2006 Israel-Lebanon conflict.
- On December 16, 2009, it was announced that the U.S. Department of Justice reached a settlement with Credit Suisse over accusations that the bank assisted residents of IEEPA sanctioned countries to wire money in violation of the Act from 1995 to 2006. The settlement resulted in Credit Suisse forfeiting $536 million.
- On July 16, 2020, a UAE-based firm, Essentra FZE Company Limited, admitted of conspiring to violate the International Emergency Economic Powers Act (IEEPA) and defying the United States sanctions on North Korea. The firm also agreed to pay a fine of $665,112 to the United States Department of Justice.

== List of emergencies ==
=== Current ===
As of 2025, the following IEEPA emergencies are active.

Starting year	Country/region	Executive order	Basis of emergency	Effect
1979	Iran	12170	Iran hostage crisis	Blocks property of the government of Iran and its instrumentalities
1994	Worldwide	12938	Proliferation of weapons of mass destruction	Blocks property of persons that engage in or support proliferation
1995	Iran	12957	Actions and policies of the government	Prohibits various forms of commerce involving Iran
1995	Middle East	12947	Terrorist violence to disrupt the peace process	Blocks property of Specially Designated Terrorists committing or supporting such violence
1995	Colombia	12978	Foreign narcotics traffic	Blocks property of traffickers and their material supporters
1997	Sudan	13067	Actions and policies of the government	Blocks property of the Sudan government and prohibits US–Sudan trade generally
2001	Western Balkans	13219	Extremist violence and actions that obstruct the Dayton Agreement or UNSC Resolution 1244	Blocks property of persons engaged in or providing support for such activities
2001	Worldwide	13222	Expiration of the Export Administration Act	Continues authority for all regulations previously authorized under the Act
2001	Worldwide	13224	Threat of terrorist attacks on the US and its nationals	Blocks property of Specially Designated Global Terrorists that commit, threaten to commit or support terrorism, including al-Qaeda
2003	Iraq	13303	Obstacles to reconstruction	Blocks property of officials and associates of the Saddam Hussein government, and of persons undermining stabilization efforts with violence.
2006	Belarus	13405	Actions and policies of members of the government	Blocks property of government officials and other persons involved in human rights abuses
2006	Democratic Republic of the Congo	13413	Violence and atrocities that threaten regional stability	Blocks property of persons contributing to said violence
2007	Lebanon	13441	Actions to undermine the government	Prohibits various forms of commerce involving persons engaged in such actions
2008	North Korea	13466	Nuclear proliferation	Prohibits various forms of commerce involving North Korea and its nationals
2010	Somalia	13536	Deterioration of the security situation	Blocks property of persons that threaten the peace, security, or stability of Somalia
2011	Libya	13566	Extreme measures taken during the Libyan Civil War	Blocks property of officials and associates of the Muammar Gaddafi government
2011	Worldwide	13581	Activities of transnational criminal organizations	Blocks property of persons involved in such organizations
2012	Yemen	13611	Actions and policies that threaten the peace, security, or stability of Yemen	Blocks property of persons engaged in such actions.
2014	Ukraine and Russia	13660	Actions and policies of persons engaged in the Ukraine crisis	Blocks property of such persons.
2014	Central African Republic	13667	Central African Republic conflict (2012–present)	Blocks property of persons contributing to the conflict.
2014	South Sudan	13664	Activities that threaten regional peace, security, or stability	Blocks property of persons engaged in such activities.
2015	Venezuela	13692	Human rights violations	Blocks property of persons responsible for such violations.
2015	Worldwide	13694	Significant malicious cyber-enabled activities	Blocks property of persons responsible for or complicit in such activities.
2015	Burundi	13712	2015 Burundian unrest	Blocks property of persons engaged in destabilizing activities.
2017	Worldwide	13818	Serious human rights abuse and corruption	Blocks property of designated persons engaged in such activities
2018	Worldwide	13848	Risk of foreign interference in US elections	Blocks property of foreign persons determined to have participated in such interference
2018	Nicaragua	13851	Human rights abuses, destabilization and corruption under the Daniel Ortega government	Blocks property of persons engaged in such activities
2019	Worldwide	13873	Vulnerabilities in information and communications technology and services	Prohibits transactions involving technology produced by a foreign adversary that pose an operational or security risk
2019	Syria (Note: Originally declared against Turkey for its involvement in the war; repurposed in 2025)	13894	Syrian Civil War	Blocks property of persons connected with the war-time actions of the Bashar al-Assad government or who obstruct the stabilization of Syria
2020	China	13936	Actions that undermine the autonomy and institutions of Hong Kong	Blocks property of foreign persons connected with such actions
2020	China	13959	Use of United States financial capital for military development and modernization	Prohibits transactions in securities of Chinese military companies
2021	Myanmar	14014	2021 Myanmar coup d'état	Blocks property of foreign persons connected with the armed forces of Myanmar or repressive actions and policies
2021	Russia	14024	Harmful foreign activities of the government, including activities that undermine the security and stability of the US and its allies	Blocks property of persons connected with such activities
2021	Ethiopia	14046	Humanitarian crisis connected with the Tigray War	Blocks property and prohibits transactions with foreign persons contributing to the crisis
2021	Worldwide	14059	Global illicit trade in opioids and other drugs	Blocks property of foreign persons engaged in the trade
2022	Afghanistan	14064	Humanitarian crisis and claims involving victims of terrorist attacks	Seizes property of Da Afghanistan Bank
2022	Worldwide	14078	Hostage-taking and wrongful detention of US nationals	Blocks property of foreign persons involved in such activities and prohibits their entry into the US
2023	China	14105	Development of technologies and products to counter US national security capabilities	Prohibits investment transactions that contribute to such development
2025	Canada	14193	Sustained influx of illicit opioids and other drugs at the Canada border	Imposes 25% tariffs on all imported goods, except 10% on energy products
2025	Mexico	14194	Sustained influx of migrants and illicit opioids and other drugs at the Mexico border	Imposes 25% tariffs on all imported goods
2025	China	14195	Sustained influx of illicit opioids and other drugs from China	Imposes 20% tariffs on all imported goods
2025	Worldwide	14203	Investigations of US and Israeli personnel by the International Criminal Court	Blocks property of ICC representatives and prohibits their entry into the US
2025	Worldwide	14256	Economic policies of US trading partners	Imposes additional 10% tariff on imported goods, with higher rates for particular countries and a number of exceptions
2026	Venezuela		Private claims upon oil revenue	Exempts Venezuelan oil revenue held in US Treasury accounts from judicial attachment or transfer
2026	Cuba		Policies, practices and actions of the government	Imposes additional 10% tariff on imports of products of countries that provide oil to Cuba; blocks property of persons involved in or transacting directly or indirectly with the government
2026	Worldwide	14420	Vulnerabilities in bulk electric power system equipment	Prohibits transactions involving foreign-produced equipment that pose an operational or security risk

=== Past ===
- Nicaragua (1985–1990 for aggressive activities in Central America)
- South Africa (1985–1991 for maintaining apartheid)
- Libya (1986–2004 for sponsoring terrorism)
- Panama (1988–1990 against the Manuel Noriega government)
- Kuwait (1990–1991, while occupied by Iraq)
- Iraq (1990–2004 for invading Kuwait)
- Haiti (1991–1994 for the 1991 Haitian coup d'état)
- Serbia and Montenegro (1992–2003 for sponsoring Serb nationalist groups)
- UNITA (1993–2003 for interfering with UN peacekeeping efforts)
- Myanmar (1997–2016 against the policies of the military government)
- Afghanistan (1999–2002 for harboring al-Qaeda)
- Russia (2000–2012 to support the Megatons to Megawatts Program)
- Sierra Leone (2001–2004 for human rights violations)
- Liberia (2001–2015 directed against President Charles G. Taylor)
- Zimbabwe (2003–2024 against the ZANU–PF government)
- Syria (2004–2025 against the Bashar al-Assad government)
- Côte d'Ivoire (2006–2016 regarding the First Ivorian Civil War)
- International Criminal Court (2020–2021 for investigating actions by United States personnel in Afghanistan)
- West Bank settlers (2024–2025 for violence against Palestinians)

== See also ==
- National Emergencies Act
- List of national emergencies in the United States
