= Office of Foreign Assets Control =

Agency of the United States Department of the Treasury

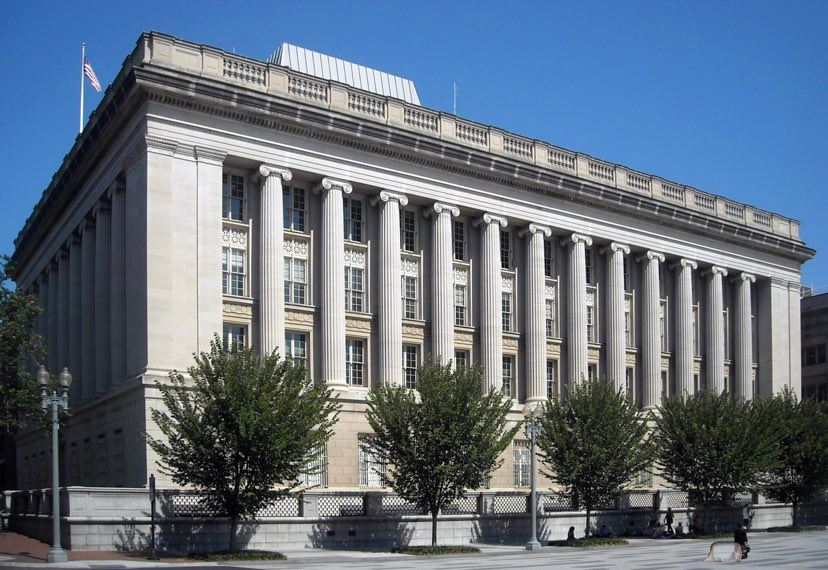
- Headquarters in the Freedman's Bank Building, located across the street from the Treasury Building

Agency overview
- Formed: December 1950
- Preceding agency: Office of Foreign Funds Control
- Headquarters: Washington, D.C.
- Employees: Approximately 200 (2013)
- Annual budget: $30.9 million (2013)
- Agency executive: Bradley T. Smith, Director
- Parent department: Department of the Treasury
- Website: ofac.treasury.gov

The Office of Foreign Assets Control (OFAC) is a financial intelligence and enforcement agency of the United States Treasury Department. It administers and enforces economic and trade sanctions in support of U.S. national security and foreign policy objectives. Under presidential national emergency powers, OFAC carries out its activities against foreign governments, organizations (including terrorist groups and drug cartels), and individuals deemed a threat to U.S. national security.

Founded in 1950 as the Division of Foreign Assets Control, since 2004 OFAC has operated under the Office of Terrorism and Financial Intelligence within the Treasury Department. It is primarily composed of intelligence targeters and lawyers. While many of OFAC's targets are broadly set by the White House, most individual cases are developed as a result of investigations by OFAC's Office of Global Targeting (OGT).

Sometimes described as one of the "most powerful yet unknown" government agencies, OFAC has the power to levy significant penalties against entities that defy its directives, including imposing fines, freezing assets, and barring parties from operating in the U.S.

== History ==
Involvement of the U.S. Department of the Treasury in economic sanctions against foreign states dates to the War of 1812, when Secretary Albert Gallatin administered sanctions against the United Kingdom in retaliation for the impressment of American sailors.

Predecessor agencies of the Division of Foreign Assets Control include Foreign Funds Control (FFC), which existed from 1940 to 1947, and the Office of International Finance (1947 to 1950). FFC was established by Executive Order 8389 as a unit of the Office of the Secretary of the Treasury on April 10, 1940. The authority to establish FFC was derived from the Trading with the Enemy Act 1917. Among other operations, FFC administered wartime import controls over enemy assets and restrictions on trade with enemy states. It also participated in administering the "Proclaimed List of Certain Blocked Nationals", or the "Black List", and took censuses of foreign-owned assets in the US and American-owned assets abroad. FFC was abolished in 1947, with its functions transferred to the newly established Office of International Finance (OIF). In 1948, OIF activities relating to blocked foreign funds were transferred to the Office of Alien Property, an agency within the Department of Justice.

The Division of Foreign Assets Control, OFAC's immediate predecessor, was established in the Office of International Finance by a Treasury Department order in December 1950, following the entry of the People's Republic of China into the Korean War; President Harry S. Truman declared a national emergency and tasked the Division with blocking all Chinese and North Korean assets subject to U.S. jurisdiction. The Division also administered regulations and orders issued under the amended Trading with the Enemy Act. On October 15, 1962, by a Treasury Department order, the Division of Foreign Assets Control became the Office of Foreign Assets Control.

== Authority and activities ==
In addition to the Trading with the Enemy Act and the various national emergencies currently in effect, OFAC derives its authority from a variety of U.S. federal laws, particularly the International Emergency Economic Powers Act (IEEPA), regarding embargoes and economic sanctions.

In enforcing economic sanctions, OFAC acts to prevent "prohibited transactions", which are described by OFAC as "trade or financial transactions and other dealings in which U.S. persons may not engage unless authorized by OFAC or expressly exempted by statute". OFAC has the authority to grant exemptions to prohibitions on such transactions, either by issuing a general license for certain categories of transactions, or by specific licenses issued on a case-by-case basis.

Under the International Emergency Economic Powers Act (IEEPA), the U.S. president can block the removal of foreign assets under U.S. jurisdiction during national emergencies. OFAC executes this mandate by issuing regulations to financial institutions.

As part of its efforts to support the Iraq sanctions, in 2005, OFAC fined Voices in the Wilderness $20,000 for gifting medicine and other humanitarian supplies to Iraqis. In a similar case, OFAC imposed and attempted to collect a $10,000 fine, plus interest, against peace activist Bert Sacks for taking medicine to residents of Basra; charges against Sacks were dismissed by the court in December 2012.

In October 2007, a set of Spanish travel agency websites had their domain name access disabled by eNom: the domain names had been on the OFAC blacklist. When queried, the U.S. Treasury referred to a 2004 press release that claimed the company "had helped Americans evade restrictions on travel to Cuba".

In the case of United States v. Banki, on June 5, 2010, a U.S. citizen was convicted of violating sanctions against Iran by failing to request Iranian currency transfer licenses in advance from OFAC. On August 25, 2010, the Iranian American Bar Association announced that it would file an amicus curiae brief with the Court of Appeals for the Second Circuit in United States v. Banki. It has also hired lawyers to request further guidance from OFAC on import of goods from Iran.

In 2014, OFAC reached a record $963 million settlement with the French bank BNP Paribas, which was a portion of an $8.9 billion penalty imposed in relation to the case as a whole.

Appointment as OFAC director is not subject to Senate confirmation.

== Specially Designated Nationals ==
OFAC publishes a list of Specially Designated Nationals (SDNs), which lists people, organizations, and vessels with whom U.S. citizens and permanent residents are prohibited from doing business. This list differs from the list maintained pursuant to Section 314(a) of the Patriot Act.

In August 2009, a federal court ruling in KindHearts v. Treasury found that Treasury's seizure of KindHearts assets without notice or means of appeal was a violation of the Fourth and Fifth Amendments to the Constitution.

On September 23, 2011, the Ninth Circuit Court of Appeals upheld a lower court's ruling that procedures used by the Treasury to shut down the Oregon-based Al Haramain Islamic Foundation in 2004 were unconstitutional. The court said the Fifth Amendment's guarantee of due process required the Treasury to give adequate notice of the reasons it puts a group on the terrorist list, as well as a meaningful opportunity to respond. In addition, the court ruled that freezing the group's assets amounts to a seizure under the Fourth Amendment, so that a court order is required.

As of October 7, 2015, the SDN List had more than 15,200 entries from 155 countries. Of those, 178 entries were for aircraft and 575 entries were for ships ("vessels"). The remaining 14,467 entries were for designated individuals and organizations. OFAC creates separate entries in the SDN list for each alias of a designee, so the number of entries does not reflect the number of designees.

On September 21, 2021, a cryptocurrency exchange was included in the sanctions list for first time for helping launder illicit funds having source from ransomware attacks. The amounts laundered are more than $160 million, between 2018 and 2021.

== Sectoral Sanctions Identifications ==
OFAC publishes a list of Sectoral Sanctions Identifications (SSI), which lists persons, companies, and entities in sectors of the Russian economy (especially energy, finance, and armaments), prohibiting certain types of activity with these individuals or entities by US persons, wherever located. This list is maintained following the issuance of EO 13662 Blocking Property of Additional Persons Contributing to the Situation in Ukraine on March 20, 2014, in accordance with 79 FR 16167.

On August 13, 2014, the Treasury Department issued guidance for entities under sectoral sanctions. It increased the number of entities on the sectoral sanctions identifications list by adding subsidiaries of entities under sectoral sanctions that hold 50% or greater ownership by an entity under sectoral sanctions either individually or in the aggregate, either directly or indirectly. Further, US persons cannot use a third party intermediary and must exercise caution during "transactions with a non-blocked entity in which one or more blocked persons has a significant ownership interest that is less than 50% or which one or more blocked persons may control by means other than a majority ownership interest."

On December 22, 2015, the Treasury Department explicitly listed all entities and their subsidiaries on the sectoral sanctions identifications list using a human readable search.

As of February 20, 2026, OFAC has over 17,000 individuals connected with sanctions.

== Sanctions programs ==
As of February 20, 2026, OFAC has listed their sanctions programs by these countries and programs:

Country / program	EO(s)	Program last updated
Afghanistan		02/25/2022
Balkans		11/20/2025
Belarus		12/15/2025
Burma		11/12/2025
Central African		12/08/2023
Chinese Military		06/01/2022
Counter Narcotics		02/19/2026
Counter Terrorism / Specially Designated Terrorist		02/19/2026
Countering America's Adversaries Through Sanctions Act		11/19/2025
Cuba		08/27/2024
Cyber-Related Sanctions		12/30/2025
Democratic Republic of the Congo		08/12/2025
Ethiopia		02/08/2022
Foreign Interference in a United States Election Sanctions		12/31/2024
Global Magnitsky Sanctions		12/12/2025
Hong Kong		03/31/2025
Hostages and Wrongfully Detained U.S. Nationals Sanctions		03/25/2025
International Criminal Court-Related Sanctions		12/18/2025
Iran		02/06/2026
Iraq		07/09/2025
Lebanon		08/10/2023
Libya		09/03/2025
Magnitsky		08/17/2023
Mali		08/04/2023
Nicaragua		05/15/2024
Non-Proliferation Sanctions		01/30/2026
North Korea		11/04/2025
Promoting Accountability for Assad and Regional Stabilization Sanctions (PAARSS)		12/23/2025
Rough Diamond Trade Controls		06/18/2018
Russia		02/19/2026
Somalia		05/24/2023
South Sudan		12/08/2023
Sudan and Darfur		02/19/2026
Transnational Criminal Organizations		12/17/2025
Ukraine-/Russia-related Sanctions		10/22/2025
Venezuela		02/18/2026
Yemen		11/18/2021

As of August 8, 2020, OFAC was administering the following sanctions programs:

Table note: The numbers of individuals, companies, vessels, and aircraft are taken from the SDN List. However, any single entry on that list may be a target of multiple sanctions programs, so summing lines of the table will inflate the true sum due to duplication.

Tag	Last updated	Sanctions program	Individuals	Companies	Vessels	Aircraft	31 CFR	EO	EO date	Ref
[561LIST]		Iran Financial	–	–	–	–	561			
[BALKANS]		Balkans related	229	–	–	–	588	13304		
[BELARUS]		Belarus	208	–	–	–	548	13405		
[BPI-PA]		Patriot Act	–	–	–	–				
[BPI-SDNTK]		Narcotics related	–	–	–	–	598			
[BURMA]		Myanmar related	219	–	–	–	537	13448, 13464		
[CAR]		Central African Republic	39	–	–	–	553			
[COTED]		Côte d'Ivoire	9	–	–	–	543			
[CUBA]		Cuban Assets Control	220	–	5	–	515			
[CYBER]		Computer hacking related	–	–	–	–		13694		
[DARFUR]		Darfur	28	3	–	–	546			
[DPRK]		North Korea	7	44	20	–	510	13551		
[DPRK2]		North Korea related	10	16	–	–		13687		
[DRCONGO]		Democratic Republic of the Congo	106	27	–	–	547	13413, 13671	October 27, 2006; July 8, 2014	
[EO13622]		Iran related	17	6	–	–		13622		
[EO13645]		Iran related	9	10	9	–		13645		
[FSE-IR]		Iran sanctions evaders	3	2	–	–		13608		
[FSE-SY]		Syria sanctions evaders	–	–	–	–		13608		
[FSE-WMD]		WMD related	–	–	–	–		13608		
[FSE-SDGT]		Terrorism related	–	–	–	–		13608		
[FTO]		Terrorism related	–	552	–	–	597			
[GLOMAG]		Global Magnitsky Sanctions Regulations	–	552	–	–	597			
[HK-EO13936]		Hong Kong-Related Sanctions	11	–	–	–	–	13936		
[HRIT-IR]		Iran human rights	–	26	–	–		13606		
[HRIT-SY]		Syria human rights	2	6	–	–		13606		
[IFCA]		Iran related	–	–	–	–				
[IFSR]		Iranian Financial	239	857	–	60	561			
[IRAN]		Iranian Transactions	19	416	175	–	560			
[IRAN-HR]		Iran related	54	37	–	–		13553		
[IRAN-TRA]		Iran related	16	45	–	–		13628		
[IRAQ2]		Iraq related	287	84	–	–		13315, 13350		
[IRAQ3]		Iraq related	102	48	–	–		13438		
[IRGC]		Iranian Financial	112	120	–	38	561			
[ISA]		Iran Act	3	17	–	–		13574		
[JADE]		Myanmar Jade	–	–	–	–				
[LEBANON]		Lebanon	13	–	–	–	549	13441		
[LIBERIA]		Former Liberian Regime of Charles Taylor	45	70	–	–	593			
[LIBYA2]		Libya related	134	3	–	–	570			
[MAGNIT]		Magnitsky Act	54	–	–	–				
[NPWMD]		WMD related	211	892	351	76	544			
[NS-ISA]		Iran related	–	–	–	–		13574		
[NS-PLC]		Palestinian License	–	–	–	–	594			
[SDGT]		Terrorism related	3,015	1,963	–	101	594			
[SDNT]		Narcotics related	436	511	–	–	536			
[SDNTK]		Narcotics related	2102	1125	5	–	598			
[SDT]		Terrorism	63	143	–	–	595			
[SOMALIA]		Somalia	199	20	–	–	551			
[SUDAN]		Sudan related	–	223	–	–	538			
[SOUTH SUDAN]		South Sudan	–	–	–	–	558	13664		
[SYRIA]		Syria related	235	180	10	38	542	13399, 13460		
[TCO]		Transnational Criminal Organizations	201	41	–	–	590	13581		
[UKRAINE-EO13660]		Ukraine related	193	31	–	–		13660		
[UKRAINE-EO13661]		Ukraine related	95	144	–	–		13661		
[UKRAINE-EO13662]		Ukraine related	–	–	–	–		13662		
[UKRAINE-EO13685]		Ukraine related	–	42	–	–		13685		
[VENEZUELA]		Venezuela related	7	–	–	–		13692		
[YEMEN]		Yemen	23	–	–	–	552			
[ZIMBABWE]		Zimbabwe	121	119	–	–	541	13391, 13469		

== Security incidents ==
In December 2024, Chinese state-sponsored hackers breached OFAC systems through cybersecurity vendor BeyondTrust, gaining access to unclassified administrative records containing potential sanctions deliberation information and future targets. This incident, described by Treasury officials as "major" and also affecting the Office of the Treasury Secretary and Office of Financial Research, marked the second known PRC intrusion into OFAC, following a breach in the early 2000s that compromised general counsel office emails. In response, on January 17, 2025, OFAC sanctioned Yin Kecheng, a Shanghai-based hacker affiliated with China's Ministry of State Security allegedly responsible for the compromise.

== See also ==
- Title 31 of the Code of Federal Regulations
- United States sanctions
