= Nintendo of America Inc. v. U.S. Department of the Treasury =

Court case

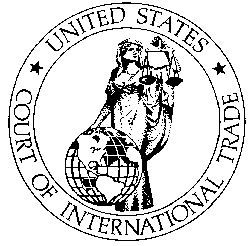
- Court: United States Court of International Trade
- Full case name: Nintendo of America Inc. v. U.S. Department of the Treasury, et al.
- Argued: March 6, 2026
- Docket nos.: 1:26-cv-1540

Case history
- Related actions: Learning Resources, Inc. v. Trump, No. 24-1287 (U.S. Feb. 20, 2026); V.O.S. Selections, Inc. v. Trump, 149 F.4th 1312 (Fed. Cir. 2025)

Questions presented
- Whether the government must refund, with interest, all IEEPA duties paid by Nintendo of America Inc., regardless of liquidation status.

Nintendo of America Inc. v. U.S. Department of the Treasury, et al. is a pending legal case filed by Nintendo of America against multiple agencies and officials of the U.S. federal government on March 6, 2026. The complaint was filed in the United States Court of International Trade, seeking a "prompt refund, with interest" of tariffs paid under executive orders issued by President Donald Trump in 2025, which Nintendo argues were unlawful. The legal action follows a February 2026 U.S. Supreme Court ruling that the use of the International Emergency Economic Powers Act (IEEPA) does not authorize the imposition of such tariffs. Nintendo states that they were "substantially harmed" by the tariffs, which impacted its business by delaying Nintendo Switch 2 pre-orders and increasing prices on its hardware and accessories.

== Background ==
A table showing price increases for various Nintendo Switch products following the imposition of tariffs under the International Emergency Economic Powers Act (IEEPA)

The lawsuit traces back to a set of trade actions introduced in 2025 by the administration of U.S. President Donald Trump. These actions placed tariffs on imports from a wide range of countries and were justified under the International Emergency Economic Powers Act (IEEPA). The first round of tariffs, announced in February 2025, focused on goods imported from Canada, Mexico, and China. The administration defended the move by citing the flow of illicit drugs into the United States as a national emergency. The second expensive round was referred to by the administration as "reciprocal tariffs" on April 2, 2025. This policy imposed tariffs on imports from nearly all U.S. trading partners and was presented as an effort to address what the administration described as "large and persistent" trade deficits. The legality of these tariffs, imposed under IEEPA, was quickly challenged in court by businesses as well as a coalition of U.S. states. Their separate lawsuits were eventually consolidated into a major case, Learning Resources, Inc. v. Trump.

On February 20, 2026, the U.S. Supreme Court issued a 6–3 decision determining that IEEPA does not give the president the authority to impose tariffs. Chief Justice John Roberts explained that the statute's authorization to "regulate importation" does not include the authority to levy taxes or tariffs that the Constitution assigns to Congress. The Court further concluded that interpreting the law in such a broad way would amount to a "transformative expansion of the President's authority." Following the ruling, President Trump signed an executive order ending all tariffs that had been imposed under IEEPA, with the termination taking effect on February 24, 2026. The Supreme Court, however, did not address how the federal government should return the estimated $130 billion to $200 billion already collected through those tariffs. Instead, the issue was left for lower courts to resolve, including the U.S. Court of International Trade (CIT). The CIT later indicated that it had the authority to order refunds in situations where duties had been unlawfully collected.

The tariffs had a substantial and well-documented impact on the business operations of Nintendo of America. The announcement of the reciprocal tariffs on April 2, 2025, occurred at the same time the company officially revealed its highly anticipated Nintendo Switch 2 console. Faced with the economic uncertainty created by the tariffs, Nintendo took the unusual step of indefinitely delaying U.S. pre-orders for the Nintendo Switch 2 while it evaluated the potential effects of the new trade measures and the rapidly evolving market environment. Pre-orders were eventually resumed, and the console launched in June 2025 at its originally announced price of $449.99. However, Nintendo did increase prices on several accessories and older Nintendo Switch models, pointing to the shifting market conditions brought about by the tariffs. Nintendo produces most of its hardware in Asia, with major manufacturing operations in both China and Vietnam. These two countries were among those subject to the highest tariff rates, reaching as much as 145%. Because such a large portion of Nintendo's manufacturing base is located in those regions, the company was especially vulnerable to the effects of the tariffs.
