= Plaut v. Spendthrift Farm, Inc. =

- Supreme Court of the United States

Argued November 30, 1994 Decided April 18, 1995
- Full case name: Ed Plaut, et ux., et al., petitioners v. Spendthrift Farm, Inc., et al.
- Citations: 514 U.S. 211 (more) 115 S. Ct. 1447; 131 L. Ed. 2d 328; 1995 U.S. LEXIS 2843

Case history
- Prior: 789 F. Supp. 231 (E.D. Ky. 1992), affirmed, 1 F.3d 1487 (6th Cir. 1993); cert. granted, 511 U.S. 1141 (1994).

Questions presented
- Did Congress violate separation of powers by requiring federal courts reopen settled cases as part of the FDIC Improvement Act of 1991?

Holding
- A statute that requires federal courts to reopen final judgments entered before its enactment is unconstitutional because it violates the notion of separation of powers.

Court membership
- Chief Justice William Rehnquist Associate Justices John P. Stevens · Sandra Day O'Connor; Antonin Scalia · Anthony Kennedy; David Souter · Clarence Thomas; Ruth Bader Ginsburg · Stephen Breyer

Case opinions
- Majority: Scalia, joined by Rehnquist, O'Connor, Kennedy, Souter, Thomas
- Concurrence: Breyer
- Dissent: Stevens, joined by Ginsburg

Laws applied
- U.S. Const. art. III

Plaut v. Spendthrift Farm, Inc., 514 U.S. 211 (1995), was a landmark case about separation of powers in which the Supreme Court of the United States held that Congress may not retroactively require federal courts to reopen final judgments. Writing for the Court, Justice Scalia asserted that such action amounted to an unauthorized encroachment by Congress upon the powers of the judiciary and, therefore, violated the separation of powers as a constitutional concept.

== Background ==
In 1983, a man by the name of Ed Plaut purchased shares in a horse farm located in the state of Kentucky. The farm was known as Spendthrift Farm, Incorporated. Four years later, in 1987, Plaut—alongside other investors—filed suit against Spendthrift Farm, thereby launching a class action lawsuit over securities fraud in federal court. Section 10(b) of the Securities Exchange Act of 1934 (15 U.S.C. § 78j) was the provision of law which served as the basis for this part of their lawsuit. At the time, there were no statutes of limitations for securities fraud under federal law, so the federal government of the United States would merely apply those of the states to federal cases based on their state of origin. Kentucky was a state with a five-year statute of limitations for securities fraud cases at the time, so the federal government applied a five-year statute of limitation to the case that was filed by Plaut and the other shareholders.

While Plaut's case was pending, however, another ruling which would impact the lawsuit was made by the Supreme Court of the United States. In the case of Lampf, Pleva, Lipkind, Prupis & Petigrow v. Gilbertson, 501 U.S. 350 (1991), the Supreme Court of the United States held that the aforementioned practice of utilizing statutes of limitations under state law for securities fraud litigations under federal law is unconstitutional because doing so violates both the Supremacy Clause because it elevates state law above federal law as well as the Equal Protection Clause of the Fourteenth Amendment because different states have different laws that had been causing different standards to be applicable at the federal level of government in separate cases based on similar circumstances. As established by the decision in that case, a new rule stipulated that all securities fraud cases under section 10(b) of the Securities Exchange Act of 1934 must be filed within three years of the fraud as well as within one year of discovering such fraud. Though Plaut's lawsuit with the other shareholders against Spendthrift Farm was punctual under the statute of limitations in the state of Kentucky, it was not punctual under the new precedent which had been suddenly established by the Lampf decision. That decision was also applicable to all similar cases within the federal courts which were pending upon its adjudication, so—citing the Supremacy Clause of the Constitution of the United States—the judge of the district court reviewing the lawsuit by Plaut and the other shareholders against Spendthrift Farm dismissed it with prejudice.

The federal government enacted a federal law which contained a provision that would have another impact on the since adjudicated lawsuit later that same year. Under section 476 of the Federal Deposit Insurance Corporation Improvement Act of 1991, which created section 27A of the Securities Exchange Act of 1934 (15 U.S.C. § 78aa–1), subsection (b) therein allowed any unfinished cases about securities fraud which were dismissed as a result of the new rule from Lampf at the time of that decision to be eligible for revival in federal courts. This provision was intended to mitigate the negative effects of the Lampf decision on relevant litigants.

These new developments meant that the lawsuit against Spendthrift Farm was eligible for reinstatement under the law. After asking the United States District Court for the Eastern District of Kentucky to reinstate his case, the judge acknowledged that Plaut and the other shareholders were eligible for the reinstatement of their case, but declined to allow it by holding section 27A(b) of the new law to be unconstitutional. Plaut and the other shareholders appealed their case to the United States Court of Appeals for the Sixth Circuit, but that court affirmed the decision of the district court. They subsequently filed a petition for a writ of certiorari with the Supreme Court of the United States, which was granted.

== Opinion of the Court ==
Associate Justice Antonin Scalia wrote the 7–2 majority opinion for the court. In it, Scalia ruled that Congress is unable to permit courts to reopen closed cases in order to upend, or at least try to upend, final judgments. Scalia posits that retroactive legislation to revive a judicial decision violates separation of powers as a concept. Section 1 of Article Three of the United States Constitution stipulates that all judicial power is vested in the courts. Whenever Congress legislates to dictate the outcome of an individual case or to reopen an individual case after a final judgement on it, Congress is improperly intruding upon the constitutionally prescribed authority of the courts.

Scalia had acknowledged historical evidence for reaffirming the decisions of the lower courts by siding with Spendthrift Farm instead of Plaut in this case. During Colonial America, colonial legislation was frequently made to overturn court decisions. Furthermore, in The Federalist Papers, the Founding Fathers of the United States such as Alexander Hamilton and James Madison criticized this practice. Additionally, in his first inaugural address, President Abraham Lincoln espoused his condemnation for legislative interference upon judicial decisions. The Constitution of the United States provides that Congress has the role of proposing and making laws of prospective effect whereas the courts have the role of applying and deciding such laws of prospective effect.

Associate Justice Stephen Breyer filed a concurring opinion. He posits that section 476 of the law violates separation of powers because it affects a small number of securities fraud plaintiffs in a purely retroactive fashion. Differing with the majority, though, Breyer also posits that Congress can reopen closed cases under some circumstances. Associate Justices John Paul Stevens and Ruth Bader Ginsburg dissented to assert that, based on about 150 years worth of judicial rulings, Congress was allowed to reopen previously adjudicated cases because the legal provision at hand did not dictate how courts can rule on cases involving securities fraud so much as it allowed for the restoration of such litigation which was wrongfully dismissed by the courts. In their dissenting opinion, as opposed to operating with fierce independence of each other, the separation of powers notion necessitates that governmental branches cooperate with each other towards free and fair governance for American society as well as those who reside within and are at least subject to such governance.

== See also ==
- Bank Markazi v. Peterson
- United States v. Sioux Nation of Indians
- List of United States Supreme Court cases, volume 514
- List of United States Supreme Court cases
- Lists of United States Supreme Court cases by volume
- List of United States Supreme Court cases by the Rehnquist Court
