= Executive Order 13224 =

2001 United States executive order

- Blocking Property and Prohibiting Transactions With Persons Who Commit, Threaten to Commit, or Support Terrorism
- Executive Order 13224 in the Federal Register
- Type: Executive order
- Number: 13224
- President: George W. Bush
- Signed: September 23, 2001

Federal Register details
- Federal Register document number: 01-24205
- Publication date: September 27, 2001
- Document citation: 66 FR 49079

Summary
- General authorization to delegate functions; publication of delegations; Scope of delegation of functions; Definitions

Executive Order 13224 is an executive order issued by U.S. president George W. Bush on September 23, 2001, as a response to the attacks on September 11, 2001. It has been renewed every year since.

== History ==
In general terms, the Order provides a means by which to disrupt the financial support network for terrorists and terrorist organizations by authorizing the U.S. Department of State, in consultation with the U.S. Departments of the Treasury and Justice, to designate and block the assets of foreign individuals and entities that commit, or pose a significant risk of committing, acts of terrorism. The Order also authorizes the U.S. Department of the Treasury, in consultation with the U.S. Departments of State and Justice, to designate and block the assets of individuals and entities that provide support, services, or assistance to, or otherwise associate with, terrorists and terrorist organizations designated under the Order, as well as their subsidiaries, front organizations, agents, and associates. In addition, it invokes a law that allows the President to bar transactions involving donations, food, clothing, and medicine and other articles "intended to be used to relieve human suffering", when the President finds donations would "seriously impair his ability to deal with any national emergency", are coerced or would endanger U.S. armed forces.

The Office of Foreign Assets Control (OFAC) of the U.S. Department of the Treasury administers and enforces economic and trade sanctions based on U.S. foreign policy and national security goals against targeted foreign countries, terrorists, international narcotics traffickers, and those engaged in activities related to the proliferation of weapons of mass destruction. It maintains a list of individuals and organizations identified by Executive Order 13224, from the U.S. Department of State website.

One of the first organisations that Executive Order 13224 was used on was the Palestinian-American charity the Holy Land Foundation for Relief and Development. It was raided and closed on 4 December 2001. The HLF was the largest Muslim charity in the United States at the time.

== Provisions ==
- Except to the extent required by section 203(b) of International Emergency Economic Powers Act (IEEPA) (50 U.S.C. § 1702(b)), or provided in regulations, orders, directives, or licenses that may be issued pursuant to this order, and notwithstanding any contract entered into or any license or permit granted prior to the effective date of this order, all property and interests in property of the following persons that are in the United States or that hereafter come within the United States, or that hereafter come within the possession or control of United States persons are blocked.
- Except to the extent required by section 203(b) of IEEPA (50 U.S.C. 1702(b)), or provided in regulations, orders, directives, or licenses that may be issued pursuant to this order, and notwithstanding any contract entered into or any license or permit granted prior to the effective date.
- Definitions
  - Determination: the making of donations of the type specified in section 203(b)(2) of IEEPA (50 U.S.C. 1702(b)(2)) by United States persons to persons determined to be subject to this order would seriously impair my ability to deal with the national emergency declared in this order, and would endanger Armed Forces of the United States that are in a situation where imminent involvement in hostilities is clearly indicated by the circumstances, and hereby prohibit such donations as provided by section 1 of this order. Furthermore, I hereby determine that the Trade Sanctions Reform and Export Enhancement Act of 2000 (title IX, Public Law 106– 387) shall not affect the imposition or the continuation of the imposition of any unilateral agricultural sanction or unilateral medical sanction on any person determined to be subject to this order because imminent involvement of the Armed Forces of the United States in hostilities is clearly indicated by the circumstances.
  - Effective date and publication: This order is effective at 12:01 a.m. eastern daylight time on September 24, 2001. This order shall be transmitted to the Congress and published in the Federal Register.

== See also ==
- Specially Designated Global Terrorist
- Specially Designated Terrorist
- International Emergency Economic Powers Act
- List of national emergencies in the United States
