= Herbert Kronke =

Herbert Kronke (born 1950) is professor of private law at Heidelberg University School of Law, and director of the Heidelberg Institute for Foreign and International Private and Economic Law. From 1998 to 2008 he served as Secretary General of UNIDROIT. From 2010 - 2011, Kronke has been Dean of Heidelberg Law School. In September 2012, he was called to serve as a permanent arbitrator and chairman of chamber three in the Iran–United States Claims Tribunal.
