= Certain Iranian Assets =

Case in the International Court of Justice

- Court: International Court of Justice
- Full case name: Certain Iranian Assets (Islamic Republic of Iran v. United States of America)

Certain Iranian Assets (Islamic Republic of Iran v. United States of America) is the formal name of a case in the International Court of Justice (ICJ). The application was lodged by Iran against the United States on 14 June 2016, on grounds of violation of Treaty of Amity, Economic Relations and Consular Rights, shortly after Bank Markazi v. Peterson was decided by the United States Supreme Court. The Iranian case seeks the unfreezing and return of nearly $2 billion in assets held in the United States. The case focuses specifically on assets seized from the Iranian national bank, Bank Markazi. These funds were seized to compensate victims of a 1983 suicide bombing of a Marine Corps base in Beirut, Lebanon, which has been tied to Iran. The attack killed more than 300 and injured many more, including U.S. military members. Iran has argued in the case that, among other things, the United States has failed to accord Iran and Iranian state-owned companies, and their property, sovereign immunity, and failed to recognize the juridical separateness of Iranian state-owned companies.

On 13 February 2019, the ICJ accepted jurisdiction over the case, rejecting most of the preliminary objections made by the United States but accepting one described by a commentator as "key," agreeing with the U.S. argument that it lacked "jurisdiction to hear claims based on the international law of state immunity." Specifically, out of three United States jurisdictional objections, the ICJ dismissed one, upheld another and postponed another to the merits phase.

The United States filed its Counter-Memorial on 14 October 2019, Iran filed a Reply brief on 17 August 2020, and the United States filed a Rejoinder on 17 May 2021. Oral argument was held 19-23 September 2022, after which the Court began its deliberation. On 30 March 2023, the Court issued its Judgment on the merits. Both Iranian and American officials have declared the Judgement a victory. The Court held that, in the instant case, it could not hold the United States liable as a violation of the Treaty of Amity, as it had been denounced on October 3rd, 2018, and therefore Iran could not stop the United States' distribution of funds. However, it did claim that Iran is entitled to compensation, and left the Parties to agree on the amount within 24 months of the judgement.

== Sitting judges ==
| Name | Nationality | Position | Opinions | | | | |
| Name | Nationality | Position | 1 | 2 | 3 | 4 | 5 |
|---|---|---|---|---|---|---|---|
| Abdulqawi Yusuf | Somalia | President | Unanimous | Majority | Majority | Unanimous | Unanimous |
| Xue Hanqin | China | Vice President | Unanimous | Majority | Majority | Unanimous | Unanimous |
| Peter Tomka | Slovakia | Judge | Unanimous | Majority | Dissent | Unanimous | Unanimous |
| Ronny Abraham | France | Judge | Unanimous | Majority | Majority | Unanimous | Unanimous |
| Mohamed Bennouna | Morocco | Judge | Unanimous | Majority | Majority | Unanimous | Unanimous |
| Antônio Augusto Cançado Trindade | Brazil | Judge | Unanimous | Majority | Majority | Unanimous | Unanimous |
| Giorgio Gaja | Italy | Judge | Unanimous | Majority | Dissent | Unanimous | Unanimous |
| Dalveer Bhandari | India | Judge | Unanimous | Dissent | Majority | Unanimous | Unanimous |
| Patrick Lipton Robinson | Jamaica | Judge | Unanimous | Dissent | Majority | Unanimous | Unanimous |
| James Crawford | Australia | Judge | Unanimous | Majority | Dissent | Unanimous | Unanimous |
| Kirill Gevorgian | Russia | Judge | Unanimous | Dissent | Majority | Unanimous | Unanimous |
| Nawaf Salam | Lebanon | Judge | Unanimous | Majority | Majority | Unanimous | Unanimous |
| Yuji Iwasawa | Japan | Judge | Unanimous | Majority | Majority | Unanimous | Unanimous |
| Jamshid Momtaz | Iran | ad hoc Judge | Unanimous | Dissent | Majority | Unanimous | Unanimous |
| Charles N. Brower | United States | ad hoc Judge | Unanimous | Majority | Dissent | Unanimous | Unanimous |
| Philippe Couvreur | Belgium | Registrar | —N/a | | | | |
^{a} Appointed by Iranian government acting under Article 31§2 of the ICJ Statute.^{b} Appointed by American government acting under Articles 31 and 37§1 of the ICJ Statute. Source: ICJ

== See also ==
- List of International Court of Justice cases
