= Dames & Moore v. Regan =

- Supreme Court of the United States

Argued June 24, 1981 Decided July 2, 1981
- Full case name: Dames & Moore v. Donald T. Regan, Secretary of the Treasury, et al.
- Citations: 453 U.S. 654 (more) 101 S. Ct. 2972; 69 L. Ed. 2d 918

Holding
- Executive orders dissolving judgments and suspending pending civil claims against Iranian government were constitutional.

Court membership
- Chief Justice Warren E. Burger Associate Justices William J. Brennan Jr. · Potter Stewart; Byron White · Thurgood Marshall; Harry Blackmun · Lewis F. Powell Jr. William Rehnquist · John P. Stevens

Case opinions
- Majority: Rehnquist, joined by Burger, Brennan, Stewart, White, Marshall, Blackmun; Powell (all but n. 6); Stevens (all but Part V)
- Concurrence: Stevens (in part)
- Concur/dissent: Powell

Laws applied
- IEEPA, 50 U.S.C. § 1702

Dames & Moore v. Regan, 453 U.S. 654 (1981), was a United States Supreme Court case dealing with President Jimmy Carter's Executive Order 12170, which froze Iranian assets in the United States on November 14, 1979, in response to the Iran hostage crisis, which began on November 4, 1979.

== Background ==
After the inauguration of Ronald Reagan on January 20, 1981, the Reagan administration agreed with Iran to terminate legal proceedings in US courts involving claims by US nationals against Iran, to nullify attachments against Iranian property entered by US courts to secure any judgments against Iran, and to transfer such claims from US courts to a new arbitration tribunal. The agreements were implemented by executive orders.

== Holding ==
In an 8–1 decision, the opinion of the court was delivered by Justice William H. Rehnquist, which upheld the actions by the Carter administration and "dismissed a $3 million lawsuit from private firm Dames & Moore against Treasury Secretary Don Regan, filed to recover a debt incurred by the Shah of Iran's government." The Court found that the administration's actions were authorized by law by the International Emergency Economic Powers Act (IEEPA). The Supreme Court also approved the suspension of claims already filed in US courts even though no specific statutory provision authorized that step. In so doing, the Court relied on inferences drawn from related legislation, a history of congressional acquiescence in executive claims settlement practices, and past decisions recognizing broad executive authority. The Court also "substantially refined the applicable test" of the seminal 1952 case of Youngstown Sheet & Tube Co. v. Sawyer and cemented Justice Robert H. Jackson's concurring opinion in that case as "canonical".

Rehnquist wrote the opinion in this "highly complex and historic case" in eight days.

== Reaction ==
This decision has been criticized for taking "an exceptionally deferential view of executive power," particularly by relying on inferences from statutes that do not directly deal with certain subjects at hand and especially on legislative acquiescence in executive activity.

After Rehnquist's death, Justice John Paul Stevens cited Dames & Moore as one of his two favorite Rehnquist opinions, along with Leo Sheep Co. v. U.S.

== See also ==
- List of United States Supreme Court cases, volume 453
