= KindHearts for Charitable Humanitarian Development =

- Founded: January 22, 2002
- Founder: Khaled Smaili
- Dissolved: February 2012
- Type: Non-governmental organization
- Location: Toledo, Ohio

KindHearts for Charitable Humanitarian Development, "KindHearts", was a non-governmental organization operating out of Toledo, Ohio. The organization's stated goal was to provide "humanitarian aid without regard to religious or political affiliation."

On February 19, 2006, the U.S. Treasury froze the assets of KindHearts after finding the charity to be fundraising for Hamas. A U.S. Federal court later found KindHearts' constitutional rights had been violated when its assets had been seized.

KindHearts reached a settlement agreement with the U.S. Treasury in November 2011, ending a protracted legal dispute over the charity's fundraising activities and for allegedly providing material support for terrorist groups, with neither side admitting any wrongdoing KindHearts officially disbanded in February, 2012 after distributing its funds to various humanitarian causes. The details of the settlement were announced on May 1, 2012.

== Links to Hamas controversy ==
According to a government affidavit, "following the December 2001 asset freeze and law enforcement actions against the Hamas-affiliated Holy Land Foundation for Relief and Development (HLF) and the al Qaida-affiliated Global Relief Foundation (GRF), former GRF official Khaled Smaili established KindHearts from his residence in January 2002. Smaili founded KindHearts with the intent to succeed fundraising efforts of both HLF and GRF, aiming for the new NGO to fill a void caused by the closures. KindHearts leaders and fundraisers once held leadership or other positions with HLF and GRF."

"KindHearts is the progeny of Holy Land Foundation and Global Relief Foundation, which attempted to mask their support for terrorism behind the facade of charitable giving," said Stuart Levey, Treasury Under Secretary for Terrorism and Financial Intelligence. "By utilizing this specialized designation tool, we're able to prevent asset flight in support of terrorist activities while we further investigate the activities of KindHearts."

The assets were frozen pursuant to authority delegated by President George W. Bush under E.O. 13224. This action was aimed at denying financial and material support to terrorists and their facilitators.

== Support to Hamas in Lebanon ==
KindHearts officials and fundraisers were alleged to have ties to Hamas leaders and made contributions to Hamas-affiliated organizations. Specially Designated Global Terrorist (SDGT) Usama Hamdan, a leader of Hamas in Lebanon, reportedly phoned a top fundraiser for KindHearts during a September 2003 KindHearts fundraiser. During the call, Hamdan reportedly communicated to the fundraiser his gratitude for KindHearts' support. The KindHearts fundraiser reportedly also provided advice to Hamdan, telling him not to trust the United Nations Relief and Works Agency.

As of late December 2003, KindHearts was allegedly supporting Hamas and other Salafi groups in the Palestinian refugee camps in Lebanon. Haytham Fawri was identified as a KindHearts official who reportedly collected funds and allegedly sent them to Hamas and other Salafi groups. Haytham Fawri is believed to be a reference to Haytham Maghawri, who has served as KindHearts manager in Lebanon, and is one of a number of HLF officials indicted by a federal grand jury in Dallas, Texas on charges of providing material support to Hamas. From 1998 to 2000, during his tenure as Social Services Director for the HLF, Maghawri allegedly approved fifty wire transfers by the HLF in the amount of US$407,512, to nine zakat committees identified as being owned, controlled, or directed by Hamas.

According to the information source from abroad, KindHearts began working secretly and independently in the camps in Lebanon after the closure of the offices of the Sanabil Association for Relief and Development (Sanabil), a Hamas-affiliated entity in Lebanon that was named an SDGT in August 2003. KindHearts reportedly attempted to maintain a distance from Hamas to avoid drawing attention to its support for the terrorist organization. In early 2003, KindHearts president Smaili allegedly complained that scrutiny by U.S. law enforcement and intelligence officials was making it almost impossible for KindHearts to assist Hamas.

Between July and December 2002, and most importantly prior to Sanabil's designation, KindHearts allegedly sent more than US$100,000 to the Lebanon-based SDGT Sanabil, according to information available to the U.S. financial investigation revealed that between February 2003 and July 2003, and again prior to the designation of Sanabil, KindHearts transferred over US$150,000 to Sanabil. KindHearts allegedly deposited the funds into the same account used by HLF when it was providing funds to the allegedly Hamas-affiliated Sanabil, according to FBI analysis. However, KindHearts asserts that none of its funds were given to any political or terrorist organization, but simply utilized this account to get money to its Lebanon offices for humanitarian projects.

== Support to Hamas in the West Bank ==
In addition to providing support to Hamas in Lebanon, KindHearts reportedly provides support to Hamas in the West Bank. An individual identified as integral to assisting KindHearts deliver aid to Palestinians in the West Bank, also allegedly was responsible for dividing money raised by KindHearts in the U.S. to ensure that some funds went to Hamas. KindHearts founder and president Smaili allegedly told a Texas-based associate that his organization was raising funds to support the Palestinian Intifada.

== Cooperation with U.S.-based Hamas leader ==
Mohammed El-Mezain, who allegedly coordinated KindHearts fundraising, a claim that is disputed by KindHearts, and is a former HLF official indicted by a federal grand jury in Dallas, Texas on charges of providing material support to Hamas. However, El-Mezain was acquitted on all counts against him in the first Holy Land trial in Texas, and was convicted on November 24, 2008, of a single conspiracy count. None of the allegations against any Holy Land defendant, including El-Mezain, were based on any connection to KindHearts since KindHearts did not exist until after the Holy Land Foundation was shut down. Information indicates that SDGT Khalid Mishaal, Hamas Secretary General based in Damascus, Syria, allegedly identified El-Mezain as the Hamas leader for the U.S. At the time, Mishaal advised that all financial contributions to Hamas from individuals in the U.S. should be channeled through El-Mezain.

Following the closure of HLF, U.S.-based Hamas leader El-Mezain transferred his fundraising skills to Kindhearts. El-Mezain allegedly assisted other KindHearts senior leaders in directing the coordination of KindHearts fundraising strategy. Allegedly, During a 2003 Islamic conference, KindHearts leaders, including Smaili, met with El-Mezain to discuss KindHearts fundraisers. The leaders concluded that there would be only two fundraising dinners for KindHearts in September 2003 and thereafter, all fundraising efforts would target Friday prayers at mosques and Islamic centers throughout the U.S. KindHearts asserted that El-Mezain was an independent contractor with no control over any KindHearts money raised at events.

At a September 2003 KindHearts fundraising event, a KindHearts fundraiser allegedly spoke and encouraged the crowd to appreciate the efforts of the terrorist group Hezbollah in supporting Hamas. The fundraiser then encouraged the crowd to give money and manpower as support against Israel. El-Mezain also spoke at this KindHearts fundraiser, encouraging people to donate to KindHearts.

In October 2003, El-Mezain spoke at an event held in Baton Rouge Louisiana where $500,000 was pledged. Though El-Mezain's speech reportedly focused almost entirely on raising funds for a new mosque in Baton Rouge, only a small amount was to be retained locally and the vast majority was to be sent to Hamas overseas. The connection with KindHearts at this event is unclear.

The government's action freezes any assets KindHearts may have under U.S. jurisdiction and prohibits U.S. persons from engaging in transactions with the NGO.

== Legal Proceedings ==
However, Chief Judge Carr of the Northern District of Ohio issued a 100-page opinion wherein he found that the government violated the constitutional protections of the 4th and 5th Amendments to the United States Constitution in failing to secure a warrant based on probable cause prior to the seizure and for failing to provide KindHearts with any semblance of due process. The Federal District Court went further and criticized the government's delay tactics and subversive efforts relating to the information relied upon in preliminarily and provisionally deciding to designate KindHearts as a Specially Designated Global Terrorist, as well as failing to respond to requests for basic information concerning the alleged evidence against KindHearts, failing to allow KindHearts from accessing the courts and employing attorneys to defend it using its own funds, and other substantial violations. See Chief Judge Carr's decision, Case No. 3:08CV2400, August 18, 2009, www.aclu.org/kindhearts. With this decision, the Court found for the first time that the government cannot freeze an organization's assets without obtaining a warrant based on probable cause. The court also found that the government must give the organization notice of the basis for freezing its assets and a meaningful opportunity to defend itself. KindHearts, according to its former members, was a non-profit, tax-exempt charitable entity that was registered with over 40 states to raise funds for the needy worldwide, without regard to race, color, national origin, political opinion or religious affiliation.

KindHearts won a landmark victory when Chief Judge Carr of the Northern District of Ohio (federal court) ordered that the government be prohibited from designating KindHearts as a Specially Designated Terrorist without first allowing KindHearts due process of law. On November 24, 2008, KindHearts filed its motion for partial summary judgment against the government, which argued in effect that the Office of Foreign Assets Control's procedures were unconstitutional and in effect unamerican.

Proponents of KindHearts' innocence asserts that the charity was shut down by the Bush administration as a political step in order to put further pressure on the Palestinian regime to accede to the Israeli version of the Middle East peace process. As a reduction of international assistance would leave many Palestinians dependent on foreign aid with no viable options for survival, it is alleged that the Bush administration attempted to use this maneuver to create dissent against Hamas, the democratically elected ruling party, leading to their loss in the next election. Proponents of KindHearts claim that the closure of KindHearts manifests the Bush administration's unveiled policy of "guilt by association".

To date, neither KindHearts, nor its officers, has been charged or convicted with any crime.

== Settlement with the U.S. government ==
A settlement between KindHearts and the U.S. Government was announced on May 1st, 2012. The settlement ended the litigation by allowing KindHearts to pay its debts and distribute the remaining funds among a list of approved charities before dissolving. At that point, Treasury removed KindHearts from its terrorist list and paid its attorney's fees. Neither side admitted to any wrongdoing.

== See also ==
- Sheikh Omar Shahin
