= Studentische Zeitschrift für Rechtswissenschaft Heidelberg =

- Discipline: Law
- Language: German

Publication details
- History: 2004-present
- Publisher: C.F. Müller Verlag
- Frequency: Biannually

Standard abbreviations
- ISO 4: Stud. Z. Rechtswiss. Heidelb.

Indexing
- ISSN: 2629-7132

Links
- Journal homepage

The Studentische Zeitschrift für Rechtswissenschaft Heidelberg ("StudZR"; English: "Heidelberg Law Review") is a law review published by an independent group of law students at Heidelberg University (Germany). It was established in 2004, making it the oldest German student law review.

To celebrate its 10th anniversary a symposium was organized in June 2014 under the patronage of the Baden-Württemberg Ministry of Science, Research and Art.

In 2024, a symposium to celebrate the 20th anniversary was held. The symposium resulted in a special issue comprising articles based on the lectures and panel discussions, along with an additional English-language contribution analysing the relationship between StudZR and U.S. law reviews.

== Content ==
The journal comprises two separate publications with different objectives. The bi-annual StudZR Ausbildung print edition focuses on study-related topics such as case solutions based on previous law exams from Heidelberg University, essays concerning exam techniques as well as jurisprudence and textbook reviews. The StudZR Wissenschaft Online (WissOn) website includes classic legal articles, analyses of recent court cases and book reviews.

== Organisation ==
The editorial board comprises around 50 law students, articled clerks, and post-graduate PhDs who manage the entire editing and publishing process as well as marketing and sponsorship functions. The journal is headed by an editor-in-chief, a chief of marketing and a chief of finance.
