= Geithner =

Geithner is a surname. Notable people with the surname include:

- Aura Cristina Geithner (born 1967), Colombian actress
- Harry Geithner (born 1967), Colombian actor, film director, and producer
- Timothy Geithner (born 1961), American central banker and former Secretary of the Treasury

== See also ==
- Coons v. Geithner
