= Iran–United States Claims Tribunal =

International arbitral tribunal between the US and Iran

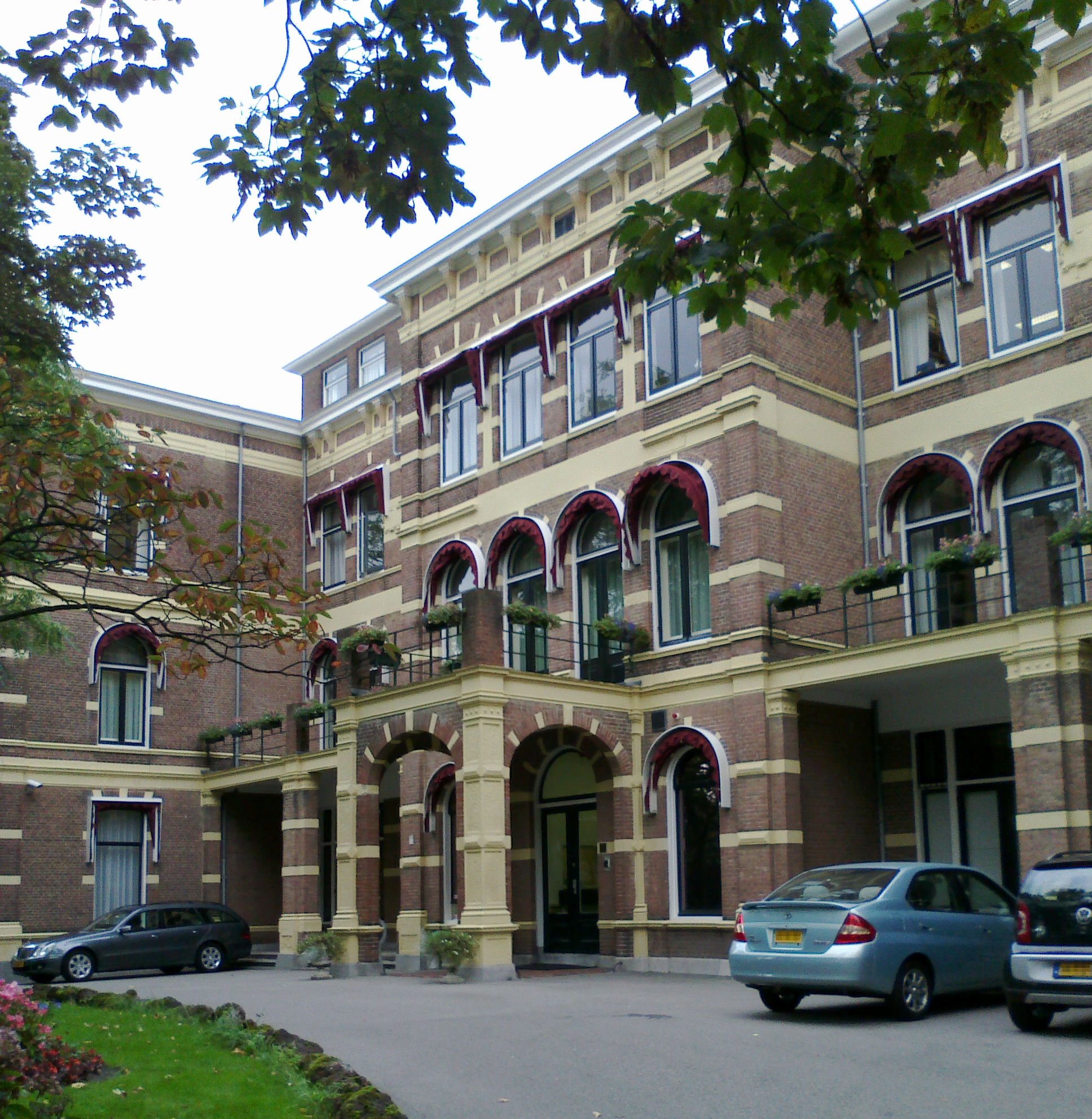
Building of the IUSCT in The Hague

The Iran–United States Claims Tribunal (IUSCT) is an international arbitral tribunal established under the Algiers Accords, an agreement between the United States and Iran mediated by Algeria and formalized through two declarations issued on January 19, 1981. The tribunal was created to address disputes between the two countries stemming from the 1979–1981 Iran hostage crisis and related incidents involving U.S. embassy staff in Tehran.

== Background ==
The tribunal's establishment is rooted in historical tensions between the United States and Iran. These tensions were exacerbated by the 1953 U.S.-backed coup that overthrew the democratically elected government of Mohammad Mossadegh, followed by Iran's demand for the return of assets taken by the Shah after the 1979 Iranian Revolution. The U.S. refusal to comply with these demands fueled anti-American sentiment in Iran.

On November 4, 1979, a group of Iranian university students stormed the U.S. embassy in Tehran, taking 52 American employees hostage for 444 days in an event known as the Iran hostage crisis. The hostage-takers demanded the extradition of the Shah in exchange for the hostages' release. In response, the U.S. froze Iranian assets, imposed sanctions, and authorized the seizure of Iranian property within its jurisdiction.

To resolve the crisis, Algeria facilitated negotiations, leading to the Algiers Accords. This agreement mandated the release of the hostages and the establishment of an arbitral tribunal to resolve claims arising from the crisis.

== Establishment and operations ==
The IUSCT, headquartered in The Hague, Netherlands, is composed of nine members: three appointed by Iran, three by the United States, and three neutral arbitrators selected by the parties' appointees. The tribunal began operations on July 1, 1981, and initially operated from the Peace Palace before moving to its permanent premises in The Hague.

The tribunal adjudicates claims in accordance with modified UNCITRAL Arbitration Rules. Its jurisdiction includes:

- Claims by U.S. nationals against Iran and by Iranian nationals against the United States involving debts, contracts, and property rights.
- Official claims between the two governments concerning the purchase and sale of goods and services.
- Disputes over the interpretation or implementation of the Algiers Accords.

== Jurisprudence and legacy ==
The tribunal closed to new private claims on January 19, 1982, after receiving over 4,700 submissions. After the establishment of the Iran-US Tribunal under the Algiers Accords, the US and Iran debated how best to deal with the Iranian's frozen assets following the 1979 Revolution. In November 1989, Abraham Sofaer, Legal Adviser to Secretary of State George Shultz, agreed to the release of $567 million of Iranian funds from an account providing for claims by US banks. Of that total, $243 million would be retained for settling remaining claims. This topic was debated for the better of the decade before coming to a resolution. It has ordered payments exceeding $3.5 billion, with approximately $2.5 billion awarded to U.S. nationals and over $1 billion to Iran. As of 2014, all private claims had been resolved, though some intergovernmental disputes remain pending.

The IUSCT has been described as “the most significant arbitral body in history” due to its influence on international arbitration, particularly in the fields of investor-state arbitration and state responsibility. Its rulings are binding on both parties and have served as a model for resolving disputes between nations.

== Constitutional validation ==
The tribunal's legitimacy was upheld by the U.S. Supreme Court in Dames & Moore v. Regan (1981), which affirmed the constitutionality of the Algiers Accords. U.S. President Ronald Reagan, who assumed office the day after the Accords were signed, also affirmed his administration’s commitment to the agreement.

== Personnel ==
=== Judges ===
- (Switzerland) Nicolas Michel (president)
- (Iran) H.R. Nikbakht Fini
- (Iran) M.H. Abedian Kalkhoran
- (Iran) Seyed Jamal Seifi
- (United States) Rosemary Barkett
- (United States) O. Thomas Johnson
- (United Kingdom) Christopher Greenwood
- (West Germany) Herbert Kronke
- (West Germany) Bruno Simma
