= Trading with the Enemy Act of 1917 =

U.S. law important

- Long title: An Act to define, regulate, and punish trading with the enemy, and for other purposes.
- Acronyms (colloquial): TWEA
- Enacted by: the 65th United States Congress
- Effective: October 6, 1917

Citations
- Public law: Pub. L. 65–91
- Statutes at Large: 40 Stat. 411

Legislative history
- Introduced in the House as H.R. 4960; Passed the House on; Passed the Senate on; Signed into law by President Woodrow Wilson on October 6, 1917

The Trading with the Enemy Act (TWEA) of 1917 (40 Stat. 411, codified at 12 U.S.C. § 95 and 50 U.S.C. § 4301 et seq.) is a United States federal law, enacted on October 6, 1917, in response to the United States declaration of war on Germany on April 6, 1917. It continues to give the President of the United States the power to oversee or restrict any and all trade between the United States and its enemies in times of war.

Franklin D. Roosevelt used the Trading with the Enemy Act, as amended in 1933 by the Emergency Banking Act, to shut down financial institutions and declare a "bank holiday" to prevent runs on the banks during the Great Depression in 1933. It was also used to outlaw most ownership of gold in an attempt to prop up the gold-backed dollar. The gold ownership ban was lifted by congressional amendment and gold was no longer used to back printed dollars. TWEA was further used to extend the president's authority also in peace time. It was amended again in 1977 by the International Emergency Economic Powers Act (IEEPA) to restrict again the application of TWEA only to times of war, while the IEEPA was intended to be used in peace time.

TWEA is sometimes confused with the IEEPA, which grants somewhat broader powers to the President, and which is invoked during states of emergency when the United States is not at war. The IEEPA was passed in an attempt to rein in perceived abuses by the US President of the TWEA by making the powers subject to the National Emergencies Act (NEA). The NEA included a legislative veto to allow Congress to terminate a national emergency with a concurrent resolution. However, the U.S. Supreme Court found such legislative vetoes unconstitutional in Immigration and Naturalization Service v. Chadha. Following the Court's decision, Congress amended the NEA to require a joint resolution.

The law set the basis for sanctions by the United States. As of 2023, Cuba is the only country restricted under TWEA. North Korea was removed from the provisions of TWEA in 2008, although restrictions under IEEPA authority remain in effect.

== History ==
The United States declared war on Germany on April 6, 1917. TWEA was enacted on October 6, 1917. By executive order on October 12, 1917, President Woodrow Wilson created the War Trade Board under Vance McCormick, with the authority to control all US imports and exports. This sought to conserve supplies and shipping for Allied use, and prevent goods from arriving in enemy hands by, for example, restricting supplies to Germany's neutral trading partners. On October 22, 1917, by Executive Order 2729-A he also created the Office of Alien Property Custodian (APC) under TWEA with power to confiscate property from anyone whose actions might be considered a possible threat to the war effort. Initially, the Custodian confiscated the property of interned natives of Germany and of businesses, such as the Bayer chemical company. On December 7, 1917, the United States declared war on the Austro-Hungarian Empire, the other Central Powers.

In 1982 the United States Treasury Department announced the termination of the Presidential Proclamations and executive orders for the emergencies relating to the 1933 Great Depression ending all domestically oriented TWEA related programs. In 1933, newly-elected President Franklin D. Roosevelt issued Proclamation 2039, which declared a national emergency and imposed a bank holiday. The proclamation cited TWEA (obliquely referenced as the "Act of October 6, 1917") as the basis of his authority. Aware that such action was legally dubious since the United States was not at war, Roosevelt asked Congress to ratify his actions by passing the Emergency Banking Relief Act, which amended TWEA to enable its use during any "period of national emergency declared by the President." President Franklin D. Roosevelt, using these new authorities, issued Executive Order 6102 to limit gold ownership. These restrictions continued until January 1, 1975. The TWEA has been amended several other times.

During and after both World Wars, property frozen by the United States, belonging to neutral or allied nations, was returned and property belonging to enemy nations was continuously confiscated until hostilities ceased. Some of the confiscated enemy property would not be returned later. Agreements to return some or most assets in exchange for seized American assets and reparations for war-damaged American interests by the new governments of the former enemy nations were later concluded. Nations or organizations that were deemed less responsible for starting the wars receive much more favorable treatment. The United States instituted the Italian Enemy Act of 1947 to deal with former members of the Mussolini regime from controlling interest in U.S. based businesses under the TWEA Act of 1917.

On December 16, 1950, the United States imposed economic sanctions against North Korea under TWEA, which lasted until 2008.

On May 13, 1966, President Lyndon B. Johnson abolished the Office of Alien Property Custodian by Executive Order 11281, effective June 30 of that year.

On August 15, 1971, President Richard M. Nixon issued Proclamation 4074, which declared a national emergency under TWEA and imposed a 10% ad valorem supplemental duty on all dutiable articles imported into the United States.

== Countries sanctioned under the Trading with the Enemy Act ==
=== Albania ===
Albania was invaded by the Central Powers during WWI. While the Central Powers occupied Albania, its assets from the areas they occupied were frozen to prevent the Central Powers from using Albanian assets. Because of this policy, once Central Powers occupation ended the sanctions were effectively lifted.

During WWII, Albania was listed in 1941, to prevent its assets from being used first by the invading fascist Italy and then by the invading Nazi Germany, and was delisted in 1946.

=== Andorra ===
Andorra remained officially neutral during WWII. However, it was a tiny country between Axis-friendly Spain and the German puppet state Vichy France. Andorra was listed in 1941, to prevent its assets from being used by Nazi Germany and Vichy France, and was delisted in 1946.

=== Austria ===
Austria was invaded and annexed by Germany. It was listed in 1941, to prevent its assets from being used by the invading Nazi Germany, and was delisted in 1946.

=== Austro-Hungarian Empire ===
The Austro-Hungarian Empire was sanctioned in 1917 as an enemy state. It continued to be sanctioned until after its defeat and dissolution in 1918-19 into Austria, Hungary, and other successor states. The United States remained theoretically at "war" with the country, by then dissolved, for several years until it ratified peace treaties with Austria and Hungary separately in 1921. No actual combat is known to have taken place between the United States and any of the successor states after the empire's dissolution and before the ratification of the peace treaties.

=== Belgium ===
Belgium's property was frozen in the event the property was from the areas the invading Central Powers occupied during WWI to prevent the Central Powers from using its assets. If the area was not occupied, the assets were not frozen. Because of this policy, once Central Powers occupation ended the sanctions were effectively lifted.

Belgium was listed again in 1940, to prevent its assets from being used by the invading Nazi Germany, and was delisted in 1946.

=== Bulgaria ===
Bulgaria was a German and Austro-Hungarian ally during WWI and some of its property was frozen or confiscated by the United States. The United States and Bulgaria avoided declaring war on each other during WWI.

During WWII Bulgaria was an Axis power and was sanctioned again in 1941. Sanctions were lifted in 1945. In 1963 the government of Bulgaria agreed to accept American claims for lost property and war damages so the Bulgarians were allowed to reclaim the property America seized during WWII.

=== Cambodia ===
Cambodia under the Khmer Rouge regime was sanctioned in 1975 as a result of the Vietnam War. Trading With the Enemy Act sanctions were lifted in 1992.

=== China ===
China was listed on two occasions. The Republic of China was first listed in 1941 to prevent invading Japan from using Chinese assets during WWII. China was delisted in 1946. After WWII the People's Republic of China was sanctioned and listed in 1950 for their involvement in the Korean War. After President Richard Nixon's "opening with China" sanctions were lifted in 1975.

=== Cuba ===
Following the Cuban missile crisis, the Bay of Pigs invasion, and the nationalization of U.S. property by the Castro regime, the United States imposed sanctions on Cuba in 1963. TWEA sanctions continued throughout the Cold War because the US and Cuba often found themselves on opposite sides in various proxy conflicts throughout Latin America and Africa. The sanctions on Cuba were increased after the Cuban air force killed American protesters who were known to violate Cuban airspace. Cuba is currently the only state still under sanctions under TWEA.

=== Czechoslovakia ===
Czechoslovakia was invaded and annexed by Germany. In 1941 it was listed to prevent its assets from being used by the invading Nazi Germany. Czechoslovakia was delisted in 1946. Czechoslovak assets were held until the government of Czechoslovakia agreed to return assets its German installed occupation government expropriated during World War II. These restrictions were lifted sometime between 1964 and 1967 after an agreement was reached.

=== Danzig ===
Danzig was listed in 1941 to prevent its assets from being used by Nazi Germany. Germany was forced to give up the city of Danzig after WWI. Because it was a former German city, there was a considerable amount of support for Nazi Germany to re-annex the territory within the mostly ethnic German Free City of Danzig. Danzig was annexed early in WWII. Sanctions were continued until Danzig ceased to exist. Danzig became part of Poland and was renamed Gdańsk. Danzig's German inhabitants were expelled to Germany as part of the Soviet proposal to prevent the German diaspora outside German borders after WWI from helping start another world war by requesting annexation.

=== Denmark ===
Denmark was listed in 1940 to prevent its assets from being used by the invading Nazi Germany, and was delisted in 1946.

=== East Germany ===
Assets originating in East Germany (eastern Germany before 1949), including East Berlin, were held until the government of East Germany agreed to return assets the Nazi German government had expropriated during WWII. These restrictions were lifted sometime between 1964 and 1967 after an agreement was reached.

=== Estonia ===
Estonia was listed in 1940, to prevent its assets from being used by the invading Nazi Germany, and was delisted in 1946. Estonian assets were held until the government of Estonia agreed to return assets its German-installed occupation government expropriated during WWII. These restrictions were lifted sometime between 1964 and 1967 after an agreement was reached.

=== Finland ===
Finland was invaded in 1939 by the Soviet Union. As a result of this, it allied itself with Germany against the Soviet Union during most of WWII. It was consequently sanctioned in 1941. Finland was considered an ally of an enemy under TWEA until the Lapland war in which Finland changed sides. Finland would have then been eligible for the classification of "allies or neutrals" and delisted with the rest of that group in 1946.

=== France ===
During WWI, France's property from the areas occupied by the invading Central Powers was frozen, to prevent the Central Powers from using the property. Other French property was not frozen. Because of this policy, once the Central Powers' occupation ended, the sanctions were effectively lifted.

During WWII, France was listed in 1940 to prevent its assets from being used by the invading Nazi Germany. France was delisted in 1946.

=== Germany ===
The Empire of Germany was first sanctioned in 1917 for its role in WWI. Germany remained sanctioned until a U.S.-German peace treaty was ratified in 1921.

Nazi Germany was sanctioned again in 1941 for its role in WWII. Sanctions were lifted in 1946 by Executive Order 9788 and the Office of Alien Property created in the Department of Justice. As Germany was judged to have a primary role in starting both world wars, the United States policy was to confiscate and sell off German assets that Germans acquired before 1946. The War Claims Act of 1948 distributed the vested property if a claim could be established.

=== Greece ===
Greece was listed in 1941, to prevent assets from being used by the invading Nazi Germany, and was delisted in 1946.

=== Hong Kong ===
Hong Kong was listed in 1941, to prevent its assets from being used by invading Japan, and was delisted in 1946.

=== Hungary ===
Hungary was an Axis power and was sanctioned in 1941. Sanctions were lifted in 1945. Hungarian assets were held until the government of Hungary agreed to return assets it expropriated during WWII and accept claims for war damages caused by Hungary.

=== Italy ===
Italy was an Axis power until Italy was invaded and Mussolini's government was deposed. Italy was sanctioned in 1941. Sanctions were lifted in 1943 after the allies installed a friendly government and it switched sides. Italy accepted an agreement to return expropriated American property and accept claims for war damages so it was allowed to reclaim its seized property.

=== Japan ===
In 1940 US President Franklin D. Roosevelt sanctioned Japan to punish it for invading China and French Indochina under the Export Control Act. Some claim that this was the reason for the attack on Pearl Harbor later in 1941. After the attack on Pearl Harbor Roosevelt imposed sanctions under TWEA. Sanctions were lifted in 1946. Japan was widely unpopular for the surprise attack on Pearl Harbor. Because Japan was the reason for the United States entering WWII, and because many Americans wanted to stay out of European wars during both wartime periods, Japanese assets that the Japanese acquired before 1946 were confiscated and divested. The War Claims Act of 1948 distributed the vested property if a claim could be established.

=== Latvia ===
Latvia was listed in 1940, to prevent its assets from being used by the invading Nazi Germany, and was delisted in 1946. Latvian assets were held until the government of Latvia agreed to return assets its German-installed occupation government expropriated during WWII. These restrictions were lifted sometime between 1964 and 1967 after an agreement was reached.

=== Liechtenstein ===
Liechtenstein was listed in 1941. Liechtenstein was perceived by some allies to be on Germany's side, even though it remained neutral. Liechtenstein was delisted in 1946.

=== Lithuania ===
Lithuania was listed in 1940, to prevent assets from being used by the invading Nazi Germany, and was delisted in 1946. Lithuanian assets were held until the government of Lithuania agreed to return assets its German-installed occupation government expropriated during WWII. These restrictions were lifted sometime between 1964 and 1967 after an agreement was reached.

=== Luxembourg ===
Luxembourg was listed in 1940, to prevent its assets from being used by the invading Nazi Germany, and was delisted in 1946.

=== Monaco ===
Monaco was listed in 1940, to prevent its assets from being used by the invading Nazi Germany, and was delisted in 1946.

=== Montenegro ===
Montenegro was invaded by the Central Powers during WWI. While the Central Powers occupied Montenegro, its assets from the areas they occupied were frozen to prevent them from using Montenegrin assets. Because of this policy, once the Central Powers' occupation ended, the sanctions were effectively lifted.

=== Netherlands ===
The Netherlands was listed in 1940 to prevent its assets from being used by the invading Nazi Germany. The Netherlands was delisted in 1946.

=== North Korea ===
North Korea was sanctioned in 1950 for aggression in the Korean War. The war is still officially in effect, with no peace treaty signed, and the sanctions have been retained due to North Korean terrorism, nuclear proliferation, and continued aggression toward the United States. Trading with the Enemy Act sanctions were lifted in 2008 in response to North Korea's steps toward nuclear disarmament and commitments to continue dismantling its nuclear weapons program. However, North Korea later developed and tested several more nuclear weapons, indicating that it was lying. North Korea's designation was grandfathered from an old version of the law that allowed it to be used absent a declaration of war. Because there is no declaration of war in force between the United States and North Korea, TWEA sanctions cannot be reapplied, but it was re-sanctioned for reneging on its commitments through the IEEPA, along with other laws, and through UN Security Council resolutions.

=== North Vietnam ===
North Vietnam was sanctioned in 1964 during the Vietnam War. Sanctions were continued until North Vietnam ceased to exist and were inherited by the Socialist Republic of Vietnam.

=== Norway ===
Norway was listed in 1940 to prevent its assets from being used by the invading Nazi Germany. Norway was delisted in 1946.

=== Ottoman Empire ===
The Ottoman Empire was one of the Central Powers, an ally of the German Empire, Austria-Hungary and the Kingdom of Bulgaria, which was sanctioned alongside its allies in 1917 with the Act, though entering the war later on. The Ottoman Empire and the United States are not known to have fought each other during the war, except for smaller-scale naval conflicts and bombardments. And little, if any, property was seized from Ottomans, as the Ottoman Empire had few resources to be seized that would contribute to the war and economic effort within the United States.

The Office of the Alien Property Custodian judged that seizing the small amount of non-war related Ottoman property that was present in the United States at that time would be counter-productive, and would later on likely invite the Ottoman Empire to seize a larger amount of American property back. The United States did not want to provoke the Ottomans in a way that might result in them targeting US affiliates, companies, property and citizens living within the lands and areas they controlled during the war, and prompt unnecessary mutual declarations of war.

They remained sanctioned after their defeat by signing the Mudros Armistice in 1918 until their dissolution with the later-to-be revoked Peace Treaty of Sèvres in 1921 after which sanctions were no longer in effect.

The Americans were not directly involved in the Turkish War of Independence which followed the signing of Sèvres, nor did the USA implement any official sanctions, but it supported Entente and Greek forces. Many US Congressmen later unofficially criticised the Lausanne Declaration Treaty that followed the independence war, and proclaimed it invalid, rejecting it by still supporting the post-European and colonial claims on Turkish lands in the Balkans and Anatolia.

These rejections were later disregarded, and the United States of America formally established normal and friendly relations with the newly-established modern, and more Western-sided, Turkish Republic in 1927.

The new Republic of Turkey was not affected by any American or Allied sanctions any longer, neither shortly after the end of the Independence War and the signing of the Lausanne Treaty nor during WWII.

=== Poland ===
Poland was listed in 1941 to prevent its assets from being used by the invading Nazi Germany. Poland was delisted in 1946.

=== Portugal ===
Portugal was listed in 1941. While neutral, it traded raw materials used in military production with Germany, though it gave much more assistance and trade to the Allies than the Axis. Portugal was delisted in 1948.

=== Romania ===
Romania was invaded by the Central Powers during WWI. While the Central Powers occupied Romania, its assets from the areas they occupied were frozen to prevent them from using Romanian assets. Because of this policy, the sanctions were effectively lifted once the Central Powers' occupation ended.

In World War II Romania was an Axis power and sanctioned in 1940. Sanctions were lifted in 1945. Romanian assets were held until the government of Romania agreed to return assets its government expropriated during World War II and accept claims for war damage caused by Romania.

=== Russia ===
The Russian Empire's property was frozen in the event the property was from the areas the invading Central Powers occupied during WWI to prevent the Central Powers from using Russian assets. If the area was not occupied, the assets were not frozen. Because of this policy, once the Central Powers' occupation ended the sanctions were effectively lifted.

=== San Marino ===
San Marino, a small enclave surrounded by Italy, was listed in 1941. San Marino was perceived to be part of the Axis, though it remained neutral. San Marino was delisted in 1946.

=== Serbia ===
Serbia was invaded by the Central Powers during WWI. While the Central Powers occupied Serbia, its assets from the areas they occupied were frozen to prevent the Central Powers from using Serb assets. Because of this policy, once the Central Powers' occupation ended the sanctions were effectively lifted.

=== Spain ===
Spain was listed in 1941 for aiding the Axis though officially remaining neutral. Spain was delisted in 1946.

=== Sweden ===
Sweden was listed in 1941. While Sweden was officially neutral, it aided both sides during WWII to avoid being at war with either. Sweden was delisted in 1946.

=== Switzerland ===
Switzerland was listed in 1941. Although neutral during WWII, it engaged in combat against both sides for infringing on its airspace or territory. Switzerland was delisted in 1946.

=== Thailand ===
Thailand was sanctioned in 1941. Thailand was invaded by the Japanese and as a negotiated settlement to the conflict, they became a Japanese ally during WWII. After Japan was defeated, Thailand's subsequent prime minister said the previous government did not get a valid declaration of war and the previous prime minister's unilateral declaration was null and void. The Office of Alien Property considered Thailand enemy-occupied instead of an enemy power so it was delisted in 1946 and eligible to get its property back.

=== Union of Soviet Socialist Republics ===
The Soviet Union was sanctioned several times under this act, though for a relatively short period. It was first listed in 1941 to prevent assets from being used by the invading Nazi Germany and other invading Axis powers. The Soviet Union was delisted in 1946. Later it was sanctioned during four brief periods from 1972 to 1976 when other Presidential economic powers lapsed due to not being renewed by Congress during the Cold War.

=== Vietnam ===
The Socialist Republic of Vietnam was sanctioned in 1975 as a result of the Vietnam War. TWEA sanctions were lifted in 1994.

=== Yugoslavia ===
Yugoslavia was listed in 1941 to prevent assets from being used by the invading Nazi Germany. Yugoslavia was delisted in 1946.

== See also ==
- Espionage Act of 1917
- International Emergency Economic Powers Act
- Senate Report 93-549
- Trading with the Enemy Act – an overview of such acts in several countries
- War Powers Act (disambiguation) – links to other related acts
  - War Powers Act of 1941
- War Claims Act of 1948
