= Tariffs in the second Trump administration =

During his second term as president of the United States, Donald Trump enacted a series of steep tariffs affecting nearly all goods imported into the country. From January to April 2025, the overall average effective US tariff rate rose from 2.5% to an estimated 27%—the highest level in over a century. After changes, negotiations, and the invalidation of certain tariffs by the Supreme Court of the United States, the overall average effective tariff rate was 12.1% as of July 21, 2026. The items most affected by the tariffs are metals, items mostly made of metal, and vehicles.

Although the Constitution of the United States grants Congress the sole authority to levy taxes—including tariffs—since 1930, Congress has passed laws allowing the president to impose tariffs unilaterally for national security reasons.

Under Section 232 of the 1962 Trade Expansion Act, Trump raised tariffs on cars, steel, aluminum, copper, and related derivative products as high as 50%. New tariffs on large-scale batteries, cast iron and iron fittings, plastic piping, industrial chemicals and power grid and telecom equipment are under consideration.

In April 2025, Trump also claimed unprecedented authority under the International Emergency Economic Powers Act (IEEPA) to impose Liberation Day tariffs of at least 10% on goods from nearly all countries. Trump also used the law to impose punitive tariffs against several countries and to order the early closure of the de minimis exemption. In February 2026, the Supreme Court ruled the IEEPA tariffs illegal in the case Learning Resources, Inc. v. Trump. The government collected an estimated $166 billion in IEEPA tariffs from more than 330,000 businesses that was required to be refunded.

After the decision of the Supreme Court, Trump announced a global tariff of 10% under Section 122 of the Trade Act of 1974, to remain in effect for 150 days, until July 24, 2026. After a lawsuit, the United States Court of International Trade ruled that these tariffs are also illegal and the case is being appealed.

Trump invoked Section 301 of the Trade Act of 1974, which allows the USTR to investigate and penalize foreign trade practices deemed unfair, to impose or threaten tariffs on goods produced using forced labor in 60 countries. He also used Section 338 of the Tariff Act of 1930 (Smoot–Hawley) to impose tariffs of 50% on motor vehicles, dairy, and alcohol imports from Canada, not presently effective.

The Trump administration argues that its tariffs will promote domestic manufacturing, protect national security, and substitute for federal income taxes. The administration views trade deficits as inherently harmful, a stance economists criticized as a flawed understanding of trade. Studies have shown that the tariffs have increased expenses and reduced earnings for companies, and have increased costs for households. The promised growth in manufacturing jobs has not been realized. Corporate bankruptcies increased to the highest level since 2010. However, although many economists predicted slower growth and even a possible recession due to the tariffs, US GDP has continued to grow. This was partially attributed to Trump's backtracking on the initial high tariff rates. There has also been no definitive indication of a significant aggregate effect on the labor market so far; however, industries most exposed to tariffs show some signs of weakness relative to the pre-2025 trend.

== Background ==
During the 1990s and 2000s, globalization and international trade expanded as improvements in communications and shipping technology made offshoring more feasible and trade deals reduced tariffs and other barriers to commerce. Although the aggregate gains to the United States were substantial, the benefits were unevenly distributed; high-skilled workers generally prospered, while Americans with fewer skills and less geographic mobility struggled to adapt to rapid economic change.

Although U.S. manufacturing employment had been declining for decades, job losses accelerated in the 2000s after the United States normalized trade relations with China. The surge in outsourcing, alongside advancements in automation, led to localized depressions in many manufacturing-dependent communities. Laid off manufacturing workers typically did not relocate or transition into new industries, even after their communities rebounded, and instead remained unemployed long term. Research indicates that these regions became more politically polarized and that their legislators increasingly supported protectionist policies.

During the 2000s, public opinion surveys and political rhetoric began to reflect growing skepticism toward international economic integration, a trend that intensified following the 2008 financial crisis. In 2008, Barack Obama blamed NAFTA for the loss of a million jobs and stated, "we can't keep passing unfair trade deals like NAFTA that put special interests over workers' interests."

According to Jeffry Frieden, 2016 "was the first time since the 1930s that both major parties had candidates for the presidential nomination who were openly hostile to economic integration, and that any major party had an actual nominee with similar views. The victory of Donald Trump in the 2016 presidential election marked the victory of an economic nationalism that had long been far from the mainstream of American politics." Trump's embrace of restrictive trade policies and broad tariffs represented a sharp departure from the Republican Party's general support for free trade over the preceding 70 years, and a partial return to the party's protectionist orientation in the early 20th century.

=== First Trump administration ===
In 2018, Trump imposed tariffs on steel and aluminum imports. He also initiated the China–United States trade war, which subjected 60% of US-China trade to 20% tariffs. Most sources say that the trade war did not achieve its goals: instead, the U.S. trade deficit widened, growth slowed, manufacturing jobs did not return, and prices rose.

In May 2019, Trump used tariff threats of up to 25% on Mexico to negotiate an expansion of his "Remain in Mexico" policy and the deployment of Mexican soldiers to help control illegal immigration. The Mexican government, led by Andrés Manuel López Obrador, deployed nearly 15,000 troops to the Mexico–US border and 6,500 troops to the Guatemala–Mexico border.

In 2020, the US, Mexico and Canada renegotiated the North American Free Trade Agreement (NAFTA) as the United States–Mexico–Canada Agreement (USMCA) and recommitted to 0% tariffs on most products traded between the three countries. Five weeks after the USMCA went into effect, Trump used an exemption for national security concerns to implement a 10% tariff on Canadian aluminum after claiming it was flooding the US market. He withdrew the tariff a month later, three hours before the 29th Canadian Ministry planned to retaliate.

=== 2024 presidential campaign ===
During his 2024 presidential campaign, Trump pledged to impose even larger tariffs than in his first term, including 60% on China, 100% on Mexico, and 20% on all other countries. He also proposed tariffs to penalize US companies that outsourced manufacturing, such as a 200% tariff on John Deere. He proposed using tariffs to achieve a wide range of goals, including preventing war, reducing trade deficits, improving border security, and subsidizing childcare. Citing President William McKinley and his legislation on tariffs on multiple occasions, Trump would use the example to emphasize his perceived benefits from tariffs.

In April 2025, Trump suggested tariff revenues could eventually replace income taxes, at least for those making less than $200,000 per year. Economists disagreed; the Tax Foundation deemed the idea "mathematically impossible".

Shortly after the 2024 United States presidential election, Trump acknowledged that tariffs might cause "some pain" for Americans but said, "it will all be worth the price that must be paid".

In December 2024, Trump appointed tariff hard liner Peter Navarro as his Senior Counselor for Trade and Manufacturing. Stephen Miran, another tariff hard liner, was appointed chair of the Council of Economic Advisers.

== Section 232 tariffs ==
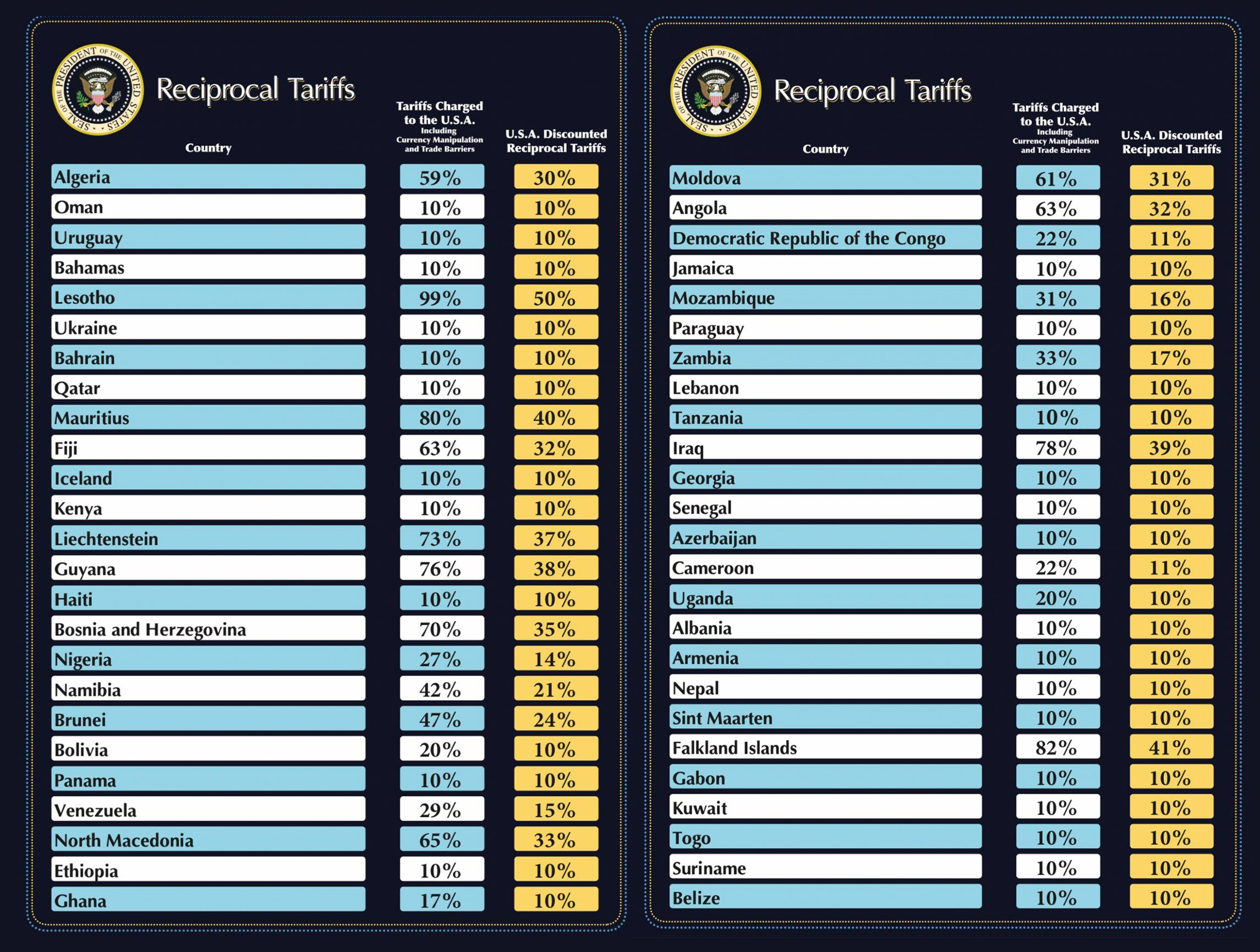
Trump administration reciprocal tariffs (April 2025)

Section 232 of the Trade Expansion Act (TEA) allows the President to modify imports if the Secretary of Commerce conducts an investigation, holds public hearings, and determines that the imports threaten national security.

=== Metal and metal products ===
Trump ordered a probe into copper imports in February 2025.

In March 2025, the US imposed 25% tariffs on all steel and aluminum imports, including and derivative products, aiming to strengthen domestic production; in 2023, the US imported 44% of its aluminum and 26% of its steel, mostly from Canada. The measures expanded Trump's first-term steel and aluminum tariffs by eliminating all exemptions and raising the aluminum tariff from 10% to 25%. Trump also mandated that steel be "melted and poured" and aluminum "smelted and cast" in the US to qualify for duty-free status to prevent tariff circumvention.

In April 2025, aluminum tariffs were expanded to include empty aluminum drink cans and canned beer.

Tariffs on steel and aluminum imports were increased to 50% in June 2025, with the exception of tariffs on imports from the UK, which remained at 25%. On June 12, 2025, the White House expanded steel tariffs to include many major household appliances, effective on June 23.

In July 2025, Trump announced a 50% tariff on copper imports, effective August 1, 2025. Later that month, Trump clarified that the tariffs would not apply to cathode copper; most of the copper imported to the US is cathode copper from Chile.

The steel and aluminum tariffs were expanded to include 407 additional products in August 2025.

In April 2026, Trump clarified the tariffs on metals as follows: Articles made entirely or almost entirely of aluminum, steel, or copper will pay a flat 50% on their full value — for example, steel coils and aluminum sheet. Derivative articles substantially made of steel, aluminum, or copper will pay a flat 25% on their full value. Certain metal-intensive industrial equipment and electrical grid equipment will pay 15% through 2027. Products made abroad but entirely with American steel, aluminum, and copper will be subject to lower tariffs of 10%. Products made of 15% or less steel, aluminum, or copper will no longer be subject to Section 232 metals tariffs.

=== Automobiles and auto parts ===
In January 2025, Trump announced broad tariffs on Canada and Mexico, threatening the highly integrated North American auto supply chain. Due to decades of free trade agreements including USMCA, factories in the US, Canada, and Mexico were accustomed to shipping auto parts back and forth multiple times during the manufacturing process. The Big Three automobile manufacturers lobbied for exemptions, warning the tariffs would hurt American companies more than foreign competitors. Trump agreed to delay tariffs on USMCA-compliant vehicles. Non-USMCA compliant brands manufacturing in Canada or Mexico, such as BMW, were affected starting March 4, 2025.

In April 2025, Trump imposed a new 25% tariff on all imported cars, including those from Mexico and Canada; car prices were expected to increase.

While the 25% tariff extended to auto parts in May 2025, Trump exempted parts made in Mexico or Canada that were compliant with the USMCA. In April 2025, he exempted carmakers that pay a 25% on imported cars from paying other tariffs, such as those on steel and aluminum, and provided a rebate on a proportion of tariffs paid for the next two years.

=== Solar panels from Southeast Asian countries ===
In April 2025, in support of American manufacturers complaining of dumping and subsidies, the Commerce Department furthered plans first issued by the Biden Administration to tariff Chinese solar panel makers with factories in Malaysia, Cambodia, Vietnam, and Thailand. Proposed tariff rates ranged from 41% to 3,521% in the case of Cambodia because its producers did not cooperate with the US investigation.

In February 2026, the Commerce Department announced tariffs on solar cells and panels imported by companies in India, Indonesia and Laos to counteract subsidies offered by those countries.

=== Lumber and furniture ===
In September 2025, Trump announced 10% tariffs on imports of softwood timber and lumber. He also announced 25% tariffs on kitchen cabinets, bathroom vanities, and upholstered furniture effective October 14.

Also in September 2025, Trump announced tariffs on large trucks, kitchen cabinets, bathroom vanities, and upholstered furniture, to begin on October 1.

=== Pharmaceuticals ===
In April 2025, the United States Department of Commerce initiated a Section 232 investigation into pharmaceuticals, including "both finished generic and non-generic drug products, medical countermeasures, critical inputs such as active pharmaceutical ingredients and key starting materials, and derivative products of those items."

In September 2025, Trump announced, effective on October 1, 2025, a 100% tariff on "any branded or patented" pharmaceutical product, unless the companies were "breaking ground" or had "under construction" pharmaceutical manufacturing plants in the US. The tariff was expected to have limited impact because most large drug manufacturers already had or were building American facilities. Trump also agreed to honor previously negotiated trade deals that capped pharmaceutical tariffs at 15%. Following the announcement, several large branded pharmaceutical companies announced or accelerated U.S. manufacturing investments to qualify for tariff exemptions tied to domestic production.

In December 2025, the UK secured a 0% tariff on its pharmaceutical and medical technology exports in exchange for a commitment to invest more money into the US. The country also pledged to spend around 25% more in new and effective treatments, the first major increase in over two decades.

=== Semiconductors ===
In April 2025, the Department of Commerce initiated a Section 232 investigation into "imports of semiconductors and semiconductor manufacturing equipment."

In January 2026, Trump issued 25% tariffs on a narrow range of semiconductor imports, primarily advanced computing chips, including the Nvidia H200 and the AMD MI325X, with the exemption of chips imported to support the buildout of the U.S. technology supply chain or to bolster domestic manufacturing capacity for derivatives of semiconductors. Semiconductors used for data centers, research and development, and non-data center consumer applications are exempted.

== Country-specific tariffs implemented under Section 301 of the Trade Act of 1974 ==
Trump imposed tariffs under Section 301 of the Trade Act of 1974, which allows the President to modify imports to penalise foreign trade practices deemed unfair if the Secretary of Commerce conducts an investigation and holds public hearings.

Under the law, the U.S. imposed phased-in tariffs on imports from Nicaragua that do not qualify under the Dominican Republic–Central America Free Trade Agreement (CAFTA-DR). The tariff rate is 10% in 2027 and 15% in 2028. The tariffs "address Nicaragua's acts, policies, and practices related to abuses of labor rights, abuses of human rights and fundamental freedoms, and dismantling of the rule of law".

In June 2026, the USTR announced, for goods manufactured with forced labour, 10% tariffs on imports from Canada, the EU, Britain, Indonesia, Mexico, Pakistan, Argentina, Bangladesh, Cambodia, El Salvador, Guatemala, Indonesia, Malaysia and Taiwan and 12.5% tariffs on such goods from 45 other countries.

In July 2026, the USTR used Section 301 to implement 25% tariffs on imports of furniture, ethanol, machinery, footwear, sugar and other goods from Brazil.

== Country-specific tariffs implemented under Section 338 of the Tariff Act of 1930 ==
Section 338 of the Tariff Act of 1930 empowers the President to, among other things, impose tariffs on imports of a foreign country to offset the burden or disadvantage from a foreign country's unequal imposition on or discrimination against the commerce of the United States. In July 2026, Trump used the Act to impose 50% tariffs on imports from Canada of motor vehicles, dairy, and alcohol.

== Country-specific tariffs implemented under IEEPA ==
Trump invoked unprecedented powers under the National Emergencies Act (NEA) and the International Emergency Economic Powers Act (IEEPA) by declaring multiple "national emergencies" related to border security, energy, and trade deficits. The administration claimed that declaring these emergencies allowed Trump to enact tariffs quickly without following the complex procedures required by TEA or other trade statutes and did not require congressional approval. While the IEEPA had been used to enact economic sanctions, it had never before been used to enact tariffs. As he signed the orders, Trump stated that declaring an emergency "means you can do whatever you have to do to get out of that problem."

On February 13, 2025, Trump directed his staff to research both monetary and non-monetary trade barriers imposed by foreign countries against US exports and to develop custom "reciprocal tariffs" to counter and penalize each one. He instructed them to consider factors such as existing tariffs, exchange rates, and trade balances in their analysis. Trump also threatened tariffs on countries that purchase Russian oil and countries that trade with Iran.

In March 2025, following actions such as the March 2025 Venezuelan deportations, in what he called "secondary tariffs", Trump signed an executive order imposing a 25% tariff on nations that purchase oil from Venezuela at the Secretary of State's discretion, under IEEPA.

On April 2, 2025, a day he called "Liberation Day", Trump declared a national emergency to address what he described as a "large and persistent US trade deficit" and invoked the IEEPA to impose a 10% minimum "reciprocal tariff" on nearly all other countries, effective April 5, 2025. He also announced higher "reciprocal tariffs" for 57 countries and territories that would begin April 9. Tariffs on certain goods were excluded.

The "reciprocal" tariff announcement led to the 2025 stock market crash. Bond prices dropped and interest rates soared in a scenario called bond vigilantism.

After prices of U.S. assets including equities, the US dollar, and bonds declined significantly on the morning of April 9, Trump announced on Truth Social that "reciprocal" tariffs above 10%, which had gone into effect that morning, would be paused for 90 days for all countries except China. China's minimum tariff rate was increased to 145%, while imports from all other countries were sustained at the 10% rate. Other global tariffs imposed under section 232 also remained in effect.

Stocks surged within minutes of the pause announcement, with the S&P 500 rising 9.52% for its largest one-day gain since 2008.

To terminate a national emergency under the NEA, a member of Congress may file a privileged resolution requiring their chamber to vote on the topic within 15 days. In May 2025, Democratic representatives introduced resolutions to end several of Trump's national emergencies justifying tariffs, but these efforts were blocked by the Republican congressional majority, with JD Vance casting a tie-breaking vote in the Senate.

In May 2025, several countries initiated disputes regarding Trump's tariffs with the World Trade Organization (WTO), a regulator of international trade. However, the United States has de facto paralyzed the WTO since 2019 by blocking new appointments to its Appellate Body and therefore, no final rulings can be made. In March 2025, the US notified the WTO that it would suspend contributions to its budget indefinitely. The US was set to provide about 11% of the WTO's $232 million 2024 budget, a fee based on the country's share of global trade.

Markets continued to rise in after further policy rollbacks and the S&P 500 set a new all-time high on June 27, 2025. Analysts suggested Trump's threats had lost credibility.

The administration announced only three trade agreements by July. While negotiations took place, the tariffs were delayed again to August 7, when they finally took effect after modifications as a result of various trade agreements.

=== Legal challenges to IEEPA tariffs ===
At least seven cases were filed in American federal courts challenging Trump's authority to impose tariffs under IEEPA. Central to each case is the argument that the imposition of tariffs, in the absence of clear congressional authorization, may constitute an overextension of executive power into areas that are traditionally reserved for the legislative branch. Several complaints invoke the nondelegation doctrine, asserting that the IEEPA, as applied, grants the executive branch an excessively broad scope of discretion. In addition to constitutional claims, the cases highlight significant economic consequences for states, businesses, and individuals, emphasizing the potential for such executive action to set a precedent for expansive policymaking beyond the intended purpose of emergency economic legislation.

In May 2025, the United States Court of International Trade (CIT) issued a summary judgement for V.O.S. Selections, Inc. v. United States and Oregon v. Department of Homeland Security and ruled Trump had exceeded his authority under the IEEPA. The CIT found the IEEPA tariffs "illegal because the triggering emergency (fentanyl trafficking and trade deficits) bore no rational connection to the trade measures imposed." In Learning Resources, Inc. v. Trump, a Washington D.C. district court went further by holding that the IEEPA does not authorize tariffs at all. The United States Court of Appeals for the Federal Circuit upheld the CIT's decision in August 2025. The rulings were stayed pending appeal, allowing the tariffs to temporarily remain in effect until the Supreme Court issued a final decision.

The Supreme Court consolidated V.O.S. Selections and Learning Resources into a single case and heard oral arguments in November 2025.

In February 2026, the Supreme Court, in a 6-3 ruling, affirmed the decision of the appeals court that Trump's use of emergency powers to enact the tariffs under IEEPA was not legal. The government collected an estimated $166 billion in IEEPA tariffs, later declared unconstitutional by the Supreme Court, from more than 330,000 businesses that was required to be refunded. In April 2026, US Customs and Border Protection (CBP) launched the Consolidated Administration and Processing of Entries, or CAPE, portal to allow for companies to submit requests for tariff refund claims.

== Closure of the de minimis exemption ==
Click at right to show/hide "front page of Executive Order 14256"

Executive Order 14256
- Further Amendment to Duties Addressing the Synthetic Opioid Supply Chain in the People's Republic of China as Applied to Low-Value Imports
- Front page of Executive Order 14256
- Type: Executive order
- Number: 14256
- President: Donald Trump
- Signed: April 2, 2025

Federal Register details
- Federal Register document number: 2025-06063
- Publication date: April 7, 2025

The de minimis exemption waived tariffs on packages valued under $800 to reduce administrative burdens.

On Liberation Day, President Donald Trump also signed Executive Order 14256, which eliminated the de minimis exemption for imports from China and Hong Kong, and Executive Order 14257, which directed the United States to end the de minimis exemption globally once customs infrastructure was capable of doing so.

On July 4, 2025, Trump signed the One Big Beautiful Bill Act which included a provision to eliminate the de minimis exemption for all countries beginning on July 1, 2027. A few weeks later, Trump imposed an earlier deadline by signing Executive Order 14324. This order, which cited the IEEPA, ended the de minimis exemption globally on August 29, 2025.

Although the Supreme Court invalidated Trump's authority to impose other tariffs under the IEEPA on February 20, 2026, Trump issued an executive order arguing the ruling did not apply to the de minimis exemption and stating it would remain closed.

== Timeline of key events and negotiations ==
=== January–March 2025 ===
Trump was inaugurated for a second term on January 20, 2025. In his inaugural address, he pledged to "immediately begin the overhaul of our trade system to protect American workers and families."

On February 1, 2025, he declared several "national emergencies" regarding fentanyl trafficking and invoked the IEEPA to impose 25% tariffs on most goods from Mexico and Canada and 10% on goods from China. Tariffs on USMCA-compliant Mexican and Canadian goods were quickly suspended, but the "fentanyl tariff" on Chinese goods was raised to 20% on March 4.

On February 13, 2025, Trump announced plans to impose "reciprocal tariffs" on all countries with trade barriers against the US in April, prompting a wave of diplomatic outreach. Analysts and foreign governments expressed confusion over the administration's tariff strategies and openness to negotiation. Canada alleged that tariffs on its exports were intended to damage its economy and pressure annexation into the US. Trump and Navarro refused to negotiate with any country.

On March 12, 2025, the administration imposed 25% tariffs on imported steel and aluminum products. First-quarter US GDP fell -.05%, but investors attributed the decline to a rush to import goods before tariffs took effect rather than to underlying weakness.

=== April–June 2025 ===
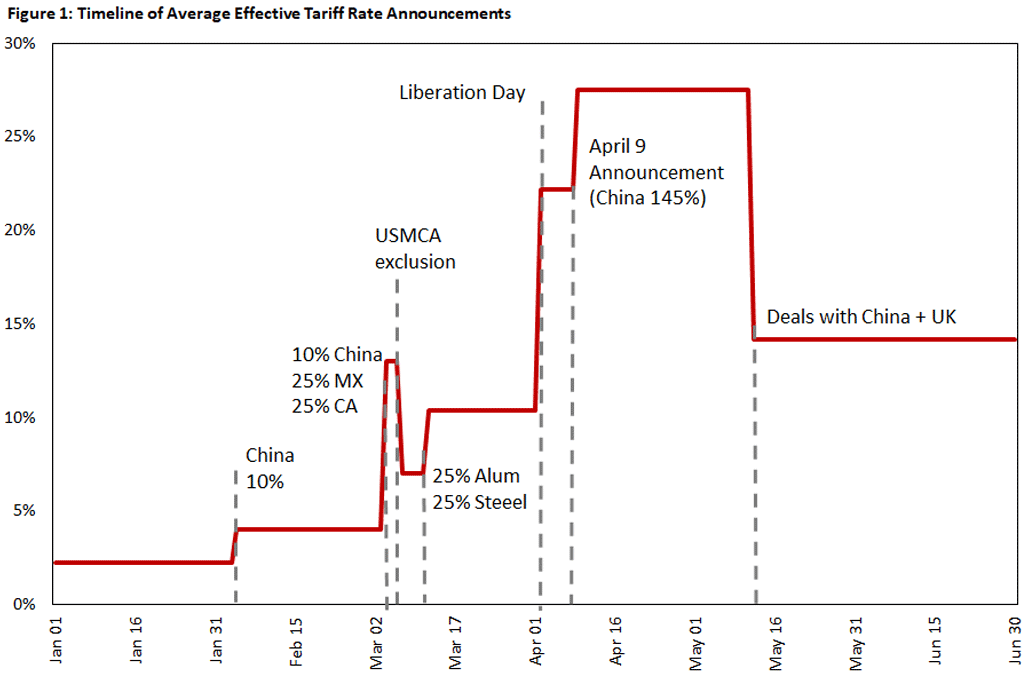
A timeline of the US average effective tariff rate from January 2025 through June 2025, based on calculations by employees of the Federal Reserve Bank of Richmond

On April 2, 2025, a day he called "Liberation Day", Trump declared a national emergency regarding the national trade deficit and announced "reciprocal tariffs" on all countries not subject to other sanctions. A minimum 10% tariff on almost all US imports took effect on April 5.

Panic induced by the announcement led to the 2025 stock market crash and new country-specific tariffs, planned for April 9, were paused for 90 days. However, after a retaliatory spiral, US tariffs on Chinese goods were increased to 145% while Chinese tariffs on US goods were increased to 125%. Steel and aluminum tariffs, a 25% tariff on automobiles imposed April 3, and other sector-specific duties also remained. Politico estimated that despite the 90 day pause, the remaining tariffs brought the average applied US tariff rate to 27%–the highest level in over a century.

CEOs of major US retailers warned Trump that the trade war with China would lead to visible price increases and product shortages by mid-May. The first cargo ships carrying Chinese goods tariffed at 145% arrived on May 6 with shipments cut in half. Trump reportedly pivoted his focus toward negotiation, sidelining Navarro and promoting Scott Bessent as his lead economic advisor.

By the end of June 2025, the US had only signed a deal with the UK and a 90-day temporary deal with China. Under terms expiring November 9, as extended, China lowered tariffs on US goods to 10% and resumed exports of rare-earth elements, while the US lowered its tariff on Chinese goods to 30% (10% baseline + 20% fentanyl) and cut de minimis tariffs to 54%.

Trump reduced some of his tariffs that preceded the 2025 stock market crash, inspiring the phrase "Trump Always Chickens Out." The stock market subsequently reached new highs.

On June 4, 2025, Trump doubled the tariffs on steel and aluminum imports from 25% to 50%, and on June 12, he expanded them to include household appliances like refrigerators and dishwashers.

US GDP rebounded to 3.8% in the second quarter of 2025 as imports normalized.

=== July–September 2025 ===
On August 1, 2025, the Bureau of Labor Statistics released revised data showing a sharp slowdown in hiring, which some attributed to policy uncertainty caused by tariffs. Trump dismissed the data as "rigged" and fired the BLS Commissioner. Trump also called for the removal of Federal Reserve Chairman Jerome Powell, who had warned that tariffs could fuel inflation and resisted Trump's calls to cut the federal funds rate.

Country-specific Liberation Day tariffs were postponed and changed several times before finally taking effect on August 7.

Trump notified foreign governments of adjustments to their Liberation Day tariffs rates in a series of letters. In one letter to Brazil, he threatened a 50% tariff while denouncing charges against Jair Bolsonaro, an ally facing trial for the 2022 Brazilian coup plot. On July 30, Trump declared Brazil's actions a US "national emergency" and imposed an additional 40% tariff on top of a 10% "reciprocal" tariff.

In August 2025, Trump ordered an additional 25% tariff on imports from India, intended to penalize India for purchasing Russian oil. Beginning August 27, 2025, Indian exports faced an extra 25% tariff and a total baseline tariff of 50%. Trump withdrew the tariff in February 2026 after several Indian oil companies agreed to stop buying Russian oil unless absolutely necessary or unless related to the fulfillment of previously agreed to contracts.

=== October–December 2025 ===
On October 1, 2025, new tariffs on large trucks, cabinets, and furniture took effect. A 100% tariff on "any branded or patented" pharmaceutical product also began, unless the companies were building manufacturing plants in the US.

On October 10, 2025, Trump made new threats against China, including an additional 100% tariff starting November 1, in retaliation of China's broadening of export controls on rare earths. China announced retaliatory measures. However, after meeting with CCP General Secretary Xi Jinping in South Korea on October 30, Trump announced the US would cut the "fentanyl tariff" on Chinese goods entering the US from 20% to 10% in return for soybean and other farm product purchases and easier access to rare earths. The US also was expected to suspend an expansion of export controls. The trade deal lowered tariffs on Chinese goods to levels similar to or below those on other countries.

On November 14, 2025, Trump exempted a variety of agricultural products from "reciprocal" tariffs or Brazilian tariffs after acknowledging domestic demand and lack of production capacity. Newly exempted products included coffee, tea, tropical fruits, cocoa, spices, bananas, oranges, tomatoes, and beef.

On November 27, 2025, journalist Annie Lowrey published a report on The Atlantic highlighting how the Trump administration's economic policies, particularly its tariffs on imported goods, make holiday shopping and everyday shopping significantly more expensive for American families and small business owners. The article concluded that the average American family is expected to spend $132 more on Christmas and holiday season shopping due to Trump's tariffs.

By December 2025, half of all US imports had been exempted from Trump's IEEPA tariffs, although some of the remaining were targeted by section 232 tariffs.

=== January–March 2026 ===
On January 17, 2026, Trump threatened tariffs of up to 25% on goods from 8 European countries as part of the Greenland Crisis. On January 21, 2026, he retracted the threat after saying he had reached "framework of a future deal" with NATO Secretary-General Mark Rutte. Diplomatic talks began soon after.

On February 2, 2026, Trump cut tariffs on Indian exports from 50% to 18% after several Indian oil companies agreed to stop buying Russian oil unless absolutely necessary or unless related to the fulfillment of previously agreed to contracts.

On February 10, 2026, House Republicans attempted to pass a resolution to extend the prohibition of the chamber from canceling Trump's tariffs, but failed after three House Republicans voted against the resolution, with Republican Representative Don Bacon who voted against the prohibition, stating that the Constitution places authority over taxes and tariffs with Congress for a reason. With the prohibition expired, on February 11, six House Republicans crossed party lines to vote to end Trump's tariffs on Canada; Trump said that he would veto the measure.

On February 20, 2026, the Supreme Court of the United States ruled in Learning Resources, Inc. v. Trump that the IEEPA does not grant the President authority to impose tariffs. The government collected an estimated $166 billion in IEEPA tariffs, later declared unconstitutional by the Supreme Court, from more than 330,000 businesses that was required to be refunded.

After the decision of the Supreme Court, Trump announced a universal 10% tariff, to remain in effect for 150 days, until July 24, 2026, under Section 122 of the Trade Act of 1974 to replace the invalidated tariffs. He also threatened to increase the tariff to 15%. After a lawsuit, the United States Court of International Trade ruled that these tariffs are also illegal and the case is being appealed.

Existing exemptions were maintained. Trump also issued an executive order to maintain the closure of the de minimis exemption under the IEEPA.

=== July 2026 ===
After Trump's failure to keep the old tariff model up, Trump imposed new tariffs on July 24, 2026. The duties are imposed under Section 301 of the Trade Act of 1974. There are 2 forms of tariffs imposed, a 10% levy and a 12.5% one. The EU reaction consisted mostly of delight because the tariff rate subsided (towards 10% with a tariff exempt for example for cork and diamonds).

The tariffs affected 60 trading partners, including the United Kingdom, Canada, China, Mexico, and the European Union. The U.S. Trade Representative said the measures were introduced following an investigation into restrictions on imports of goods produced with forced labour in these economies. However, critics questioned the justification for applying similar tariff rates to countries with differing records on combating forced labour. The USTR also announced exemptions for certain products and circumstances.

The measures drew criticism from several affected countries. Brazil described the tariffs as "arbitrary and unjustified", while Australia's trade minister said the tariffs were inconsistent with the Australia–United States Free Trade Agreement and should be removed. Mexico said it would not impose retaliatory tariffs, with President Claudia Sheinbaum stating that most Mexican exports remained protected under the United States–Mexico–Canada Agreement (USMCA).

The new tariffs also prompted a legal challenge in the United States. Two small American businesses, Burlap and Barrel, a New York spice retailer, and Collective Horology, a California watch seller, sued the Trump administration over the duties affecting more than 80 countries. The lawsuit, filed by the Liberty Justice Center in a federal trade court, argued that the administration had exceeded its legal authority in imposing the measures. The businesses argued that the use of Section 301 of the Trade Act of 1974 did not allow for such broad tariffs and that the government needed more specific findings to justify them. The Liberty Justice Center had previously challenged Trump’s tariff policies in court and won cases related to earlier tariff actions.

== Impacts ==
Upon imposing the highest U.S. tariffs since the Great Depression (called "Liberation Day" in April 2025), Trump claimed that "jobs and factories will come roaring back". However, manufacturing employment declined every month for the rest of the year.

Though Trump claimed in December 2025 that "inflation has stopped", the consumer price index (CPI) began increasing in the months following his April 2025 announcement of tariffs.

Consumer sentiment declined during the early part of Trump's second term. The University of Michigan Index of Consumer Sentiment reached a record low in April 2026.

Trump asserted tariffs on Chinese goods in February and April 2025, igniting a trade war that injected uncertainty as China turned to other sources.

In January 2026, the US dollar reached its lowest point in four years. A lower dollar makes US goods less expensive abroad, but it also makes foreign products more expensive in the US and thus tends to increase inflation.

Studies have shown that the tariffs have increased expenses and reduced earnings for companies and have increased costs for households.

Goldman Sachs estimated that as of August 2025, tariff incidence was paid 37% by US consumers, 51% by US businesses, and 9% by foreign exporters. About 3% was attributed to potential tariff evasion. A study by the Federal Reserve Bank of New York estimated that in the first 11 months of 2025, between 6% and 14% of tariff costs were paid by foreign exporters. Studies by the National Bureau of Economic Research and the Kiel Institute estimated that US consumers and businesses pay a total of 94% and 96% of the tariffs, respectively.

The promised growth in manufacturing jobs has not been realized.

The tariffs led to policy uncertainty and prompted a drop in consumer confidence. More than half of Americans blamed the Trump administration, perceiving it to be responsible for the rising cost of living. The same section of the population disapproved of the Trump administration increasing tariffs. Corporate bankruptcies in the United States increased to the highest level since 2010.

The tariffs have led to a sharp reduction in the exports of U.S. crops due to retaliatory tariffs by other countries, particularly China, leading to many bankruptcies of U.S. farms; the impact has been partially mitigated by the Trump administration farmer bailouts.

However, although many economists and economic research bodies predicted slower growth and even a possible recession due to the tariffs, U.S. GDP has continued to grow, which partially has been attributed to backtracking by Trump off of the initial high tariff rates. There has also been no definitive indication of a significant aggregate effect on the labor market so far; however, industries most exposed to tariffs show some signs of weakness relative to the pre-2025 trend.

== Summary table ==
Enacted US tariffs
Section 122 tariffs
Tariff	Effective	Status	Notes	Ref.
10% universal tariff on all countries	20 February 2026	Expired	Expired on 20 July 2026 unless confirmed by Congress	
Section 232 tariffs
Tariff	Effective	Status	Notes	Ref.
50% tariff on steel and aluminum products	March 12, 2025; Increased June 4, 2025	In effect	On April 4, 2025, the aluminum tariff expanded to include canned beer and empty aluminum cans.; On June 4, 2025, tariffs doubled from 25% to 50%.; On June 23, 2025, steel tariffs expanded to include household appliances like washing machines and refrigerators.; On August 19, 2025, tariffs expanded to include 407 additional products including construction materials and furniture.	
50% tariff on copper	August 1, 2025	In effect	Applies to semi-finished and copper intensive items such as pipes and electrical components.; Excludes raw input material copper cathode, copper ores, concentrates and scraps.	
25% tariff on automobiles and auto parts	April 3, 2025	In effect	Reduced to 10% for UK; 15% for Japan, South Korea and EU.; Auto parts were added on May 3, 2025. Parts compliant with the USMCA were excluded.	
100% tariff on brand name pharmaceuticals	October 1, 2025	Partially in effect	Excludes products from companies owning or building manufacturing plants inside the US.; On December 1, 2025, the UK reached a deal for 0% tariffs on their medical exports.	
10% tariff on timber and lumber	October 14, 2025	In effect		
30% tariff on upholstered wooden products and 50% on cabinets and vanities	October 14, 2025; Increased January 1, 2026	In effect	Duties rose from 25% on January 1, 2026.	
25% tariff on trucks and 10% tariff on busses	November 1, 2025	In effect		
IEEPA tariffs
Global de minimis exemption closure	August 29, 2025	Struck down	See § Closure of the de minimis exemption	
10% universal "reciprocal tariff" on all imported goods	April 5, 2025	Struck down	See § "Reciprocal" tariff policy.; Not applicable to § Excluded goods.	
Country-specific "reciprocal tariffs"	August 7, 2025	Struck down	See § "Reciprocal" tariff policy.; Not applicable to § Excluded goods.; Implementation was delayed from April 9, 2025, to July 8, 2025, and then again to August 7, 2025.	
30% tariff on all Chinese goods	May 14, 2025	Struck down	Total tariff of 30% includes: 20% "fentanyl tariff" (10% on February 4, 2025 + 10% on March 4, 2025); 10% universal tariff, not applicable to § Excluded goods.	
De minimis exemption closure for China and Hong Kong	May 3, 2025; Decreased May 12, 2025	Struck down	See § Closure of the de minimis exemption. Tariff cut to 54% from 120% on May 14.	
145% tariff on all imports from China	February 4, 2025; Increased March 4, 2025; Increased April 9, 2025; Paused May 14, 2025	Paused, then struck down	Total tariff of 145% includes: 20% "fentanyl tariff" (10% on February 4, 2025 + 10% on March 4, 2025); 125% "reciprocal tariff" (34% initial tariff + 50% retaliation + 41% retaliation). Not applicable to § Excluded goods.; On May 14, 2025, tariff was reduced to 30% for 90 days pending trade talks. The reduction expired November 9, 2025, as extended but an agreement was reached on November 1, 2025.	
40% tariff on imports from Brazil	August 6, 2025	Struck down	Imposed by Executive Order 14323.	
25% secondary tariff on imports from India	August 27, 2025	Struck down	Imposed by Executive Order 14329 as a penalty for India's purchases of Russian oil.; Trump announced he would withdraw the tariff on February 2, 2026, but the terms and dates were not revealed.	
35% tariff on most imports from Canada + 10% on Canadian oil and gas	March 4, 2025; Increased August 1, 2025	Struck down	Tariffs on USMCA-compliant goods are delayed indefinitely. 38% of Canadian goods were compliant in 2024, but Canada expected the "vast majority" of goods to be quickly made compliant.; Tariff increased from 25% to 35% on August 1, 2025	
25% tariff on all imports from Mexico	March 4, 2025	Struck down	Tariffs on USMCA-compliant goods are delayed indefinitely. 50% of Mexican goods were compliant in 2024, but Mexico planned to increase to 85–90%.	
25% tariff on imports from countries importing Venezuelan oil	April 2, 2025	Announced, but struck down before it could be implemented	The Secretary of State may impose a 25% tariff on goods from any country that imports Venezuelan oil, directly or indirectly, after April 2, 2025.	
Section 338 of Smoot-Hawley Tariff Act
Tariff	Effective	Status	Notes	Ref.
50% tariff on various imports from Canada	August 22, 2026	In effect	Affected products include dairy, liquor, paper and wood, sports gear, clothing and fabric, and cars. These tariffs exclude potash, energy, critical minerals, and other items already facing tariffs under section 232.	
Foreign retaliation
Country/Region	Effective	Status	Notes	Ref.
Canada	March 4, 2025	Partially in effect	25% on $20.8 billion (CA$30 billion) of US goods in effect. A planned expansion to an additional $86 billion (CA$125 billion) worth of US goods was suspended on March 6, 2025.; On April 15, 2025, Canada added a 6-month suspension on tariffs for imports critical to manufacturing, food and beverage processing, healthcare, national security and other objectives.	
Canada	March 13, 2025	Partially in effect	25% tariffs on $20.6 billion (CA$29.8 billion) of US goods: $8.7 billion (CA$12.6 billion) steel products, $2 billion (CA$3 billion) aluminum products, and $9.9 billion (CA$14.2 billion) misc. goods.; On April 15, 2025, Canada added a 6-month suspension on tariffs for imports critical to manufacturing, food and beverage processing, healthcare, national security and other objectives.; On June 20, 2025, Carney said Canada would increase its counter-tariffs on steel and aluminium products on July 21, 2025, if talks with the US stalled.	
Canada	April 9, 2025	In effect	25% tariff on non-USMCA compliant vehicles imported into Canada from the US. On April 15, 2025, Canada exempted a quota of cars from automakers that manufacture in Canada.	
China	February 4, 2025	In effect	15% tariff on coals and liquefied natural gas, 10% on oil and agricultural machines, and investigations on US companies.	
China	March 10, 2025	In effect	10–15% tariffs on US meat and agricultural products, suspension of US lumber imports, revocation of soybean import licenses for 3 US firms.	
China	April 10, 2025	In effect	Originally 34% on all US goods effective April 10, 2025, China raised the baseline to 84% on April 9, 2025, 125% on April 12, 2025, and reduced to 10% from May 14, 2025, for 90 days, then extended to November 9, 2025.	A new trade deal was announced on November 1.
China	April 4, 2025	Paused	China globally suspended exports of a range of rare earth minerals and magnets critical to auto, defense, aerospace, and semiconductor industries.; Following an initial trade deal with the US on May 12, 2025, China agreed to resume exports. The US alleged China failed to follow through and reiterated the agreement in a trade deal announced June 11, 2025.	
European Union	April 15, 2025	Paused	25% tariffs on $23.8 billion (€21 billion) of US goods, targeting farm produce and $13.5 billion products from Republican states (reduced from an initial threat of €26 billion to begin April 1, 2025).; EU proposed increasing tariffs to target $100 billion of US goods.; On August 4, 2025, a delay until August 7, 2025, was extended for another 6 months.	
Proposed US tariffs
Digital Service Taxes (DSTs)		In development	Trump directed USTR to initiate a Section 301 investigation into DSTs, particularly against France, Austria, Italy, Spain, Turkey, and the UK	
Semiconductors		In development	Trump directed the Commerce Secretary to initiate a Section 232 investigation into "imports of semiconductors and semiconductor manufacturing equipment".	
Processed critical minerals and derivative products		In development	Trump directed the Commerce Secretary to initiate a Section 232 investigation into "imports of processed critical minerals, as well as their derivative products".	
Trucks and truck parts		In development	Trump directed the Commerce Secretary to initiate a Section 232 investigation into "imports of medium-duty trucks, heavy-duty, trucks, and medium- and heavy-duty truck parts, and their derivative products".	
Commercial aircraft and jet engines and parts		In development	Trump directed the Commerce Secretary to initiate a Section 232 investigation into "imports of commercial aircraft and jet engines, and parts for commercial aircraft and jet engines".	
Personal protective equipment		In development	Trump directed the Commerce Secretary to initiate a Section 232 investigation into "Imports of personal protective equipment, medical consumables, and medical equipment, including devices".	

== See also ==
- List of the largest trading partners of the United States
- 2025 United States boycott – International consumer movement
- Chicken tax – American tariff on light trucks in effect since 1964
- Dedollarisation – Replacing US dollar for other currencies
- Economic sanctions – Financial penalties applied by nations
- Foreign policy of the second Trump administration
- Hands Off protests – 2025 protests against Donald Trump
- Mercantilism – Economic policy emphasizing exports
- Movements for the United States annexation of Canada § Proposals to annex Canada by Donald Trump
- Tariffs in the first Trump administration
- Timeline of the 2025–2026 United States trade war with Canada
- Trade war – Economic conflict using tariffs or other trade barriers
- Trump Always Chickens Out – Phrase describing policies of the Trump administration
- U.S. economic performance by presidential party – United States economy by president since World War II
