= List of national emergencies in the United States =

A national emergency is a situation in which a government is empowered to perform actions not normally permitted. The 1976 National Emergencies Act implemented various legal requirements regarding emergencies declared by the President of the United States.

As of July 2025, 90 emergencies have been declared; 42 have expired and another 51 are currently in effect, each having been renewed annually by the president.

Status	President	Start date	End date	Category	Source Document(s)	Title	Description
Ended	Wilson	February 5, 1917	March 3, 1921	Maritime	Proclamation 1354	Emergency in Water Transportation of the United States	Declared a national emergency arising from insufficient tonnage to carry the products of the farms, forests, mines and manufacturing industries of the United States, and admonishes all citizens to abide by the regulations in the Shipping Act.
Ended	Franklin Roosevelt	March 6, 1933	September 14, 1978	Economic	Proclamation 2039	Declaring Bank Holiday	Declared a bank holiday from March 6 through March 9, 1933, using the Trading with the Enemy Act of 1917 as a legal basis. The first of four emergencies cited by Senate Report 93-549 (1973) as never having been terminated.
Ended	Franklin Roosevelt	September 8, 1939	April 28, 1952	Military	Proclamation 2352	Proclaiming a National Emergency in Connection with the Observance, Safeguarding, and Enforcement of Neutrality and the Strengthening of the National Defense Within the Limits of Peace-Time Authorizations	
Ended	Franklin Roosevelt	May 27, 1941	April 28, 1952	Military	Proclamation 2487	Proclaiming That an Unlimited National Emergency Confronts This Country, Which Requires That Its Military, Naval, Air and Civilian Defenses Be Put on the Basis of Readiness to Repel Any and All Acts or Threats of Aggression Directed Toward Any Part of the Western Hemisphere	Declaration of an unlimited national emergency under threat from Nazi Germany.
Ended	Truman	December 16, 1950	September 14, 1978	Military	Proclamation 2914	Proclaiming the Existence of a National Emergency	Declared that the United States' "military, naval, air and civilian defenses" should be used to fight communism as part of the Korean War. The second of four emergencies cited by Senate Report 93-549 as never having been terminated.
Ended	Nixon	March 23, 1970	September 14, 1978	Economic	Proclamation 3972	Declaring a National Emergency	Declaration in response to the 1970 United States Postal Service strike. The third of four emergencies cited by Senate Report 93-549 as never having been terminated.
Ended	Nixon	August 15, 1971	September 14, 1978	Trade	Proclamation 4074	Imposition of Supplemental Duty for Balance of Payments Purposes	Imposed import controls in response to the Nixon shock. The last of four emergencies cited by Senate Report 93-549 as never having been terminated.
Current	Carter	November 14, 1979		Sanctions	Executive Order 12170	Blocking Iranian Government Property	Ordered the freezing of Iranian assets as part of the U.S. response during the Iran hostage crisis
Ended	Carter	April 17, 1980	April 17, 1981	Sanctions	Executive Order 12211, Executive Order 12282	Further Prohibitions on Transactions with Iran	Prohibitions revoked on January 19, 1981, but national emergency neither terminated nor continued
Ended	Reagan	October 14, 1983	December 20, 1983	Trade	Executive Order 12444	Continuation of Export Control Regulations	Expiry of the Export Administration Act of 1979
Ended	Reagan	March 30, 1984	July 12, 1985	Trade	Executive Order 12470	Continuation of Export Control Regulations	Expiry of the Export Administration Act of 1979
Ended	Reagan	May 1, 1985	March 13, 1990	Sanctions	Executive Order 12513	Prohibiting Trade and Certain Other Transactions Involving Nicaragua	The United States embargo against Nicaragua, followed the victory by Sandinista candidate Daniel Ortega in the 1984 Nicaraguan general election over the U.S.-backed Contras
Ended	Reagan	September 9, 1985	July 10, 1991	Sanctions	Executive Order 12532	Prohibiting Trade and Certain Other Transactions Involving South Africa	Response to the initial attempt by Senate Democrats to pass what would be the Comprehensive Anti-Apartheid Act of 1986
Ended	Reagan	January 7, 1986	September 20, 2004	Sanctions	Executive Order 12543	Prohibiting Trade and Certain Transactions Involving Libya	Followed the 1985 Rome and Vienna airport attacks
Ended	Reagan	April 8, 1988	April 5, 1990	Sanctions	Executive Order 12635	Prohibiting Certain Transactions with Respect to Panama	Deteriorating relationship between the U.S. and General Manuel Noriega
Ended	Bush (H.W.)	August 2, 1990	July 29, 2004	Sanctions	Executive Order 12722	Blocking Iraqi Government Property and Prohibiting Transactions with Iraq	In response to the invasion of Kuwait
Ended	Bush (H.W.)	September 30, 1990	September 30, 1993	Trade	Executive Order 12730	Continuation of Export Control Regulations	Expiry of the Export Administration Act of 1979
Ended	Bush (H.W.)	November 16, 1990	November 11, 1994	Arms	Executive Order 12735	Chemical and Biological Weapons Proliferation	Followed the signing with the U.S.S.R. of the 1990 Chemical Weapons Accord, and preceded the May 1991 commitment by George H.W. Bush to destroy weapon agents, systems, and production facilities of the United States chemical weapons program
Ended	Bush (H.W.)	October 4, 1991	October 14, 1994	Sanctions	Executive Order 12775, Executive Order 12914	Prohibiting Certain Transactions with Respect to Haiti	Followed the 1991 Haitian coup d'état against President Jean-Bertrand Aristide. Re-declared by Clinton on May 7, 1994 in Executive Order 12914
Ended	Bush (H.W.)	May 30, 1992	May 28, 2003	Sanctions	Executive Order 12808	Blocking "Yugoslav Government" Property and Property of the Governments of Serbia and Montenegro	In response to the start of the Bosnian War
Ended	Clinton	September 26, 1993	May 6, 2003	Sanctions	Executive Order 12865	Prohibiting Certain Transactions Involving UNITA	Imposed economic sanctions on UNITA, a political group in Angola.
Ended	Clinton	September 30, 1993	September 29, 1994	Arms	Executive Order 12868	Measures To Restrict the Participation by United States Persons in Weapons Proliferation Activities	Restricted US development of nuclear and chemical weapons.
Ended	Clinton	June 30, 1994	August 19, 1994	Trade	Executive Order 12923	Continuation of Export Control Regulations	
Ended	Clinton	August 19, 1994	April 4, 2001	Trade	Executive Order 12924	Continuation of Export Control Regulations	Revoked and revised Executive Order 12923.
Ended	Clinton	September 29, 1994	November 14, 1994	Sanctions	Executive Order 12930	Measures to Restrict the Participation by United States Persons in Weapons Proliferation Activities	
Ended	Clinton	October 25, 1994	May 28, 2003	Sanctions	Executive Order 12934	Blocking Property and Additional Measures With Respect to the Bosnian Serb-Controlled Areas of the Republic of Bosnia and Herzegovina	
Current	Clinton	November 14, 1994		Arms	Executive Order 12938	Proliferation of Weapons of Mass Destruction	Provides for control over the export of weapons; combined two previous national emergencies regarding WMDs.
Ended	Clinton	January 23, 1995	September 10, 2019	Sanctions	Executive Order 12947	Prohibiting Transactions With Terrorists Who Threaten To Disrupt the Middle East Peace Process	Imposed economic sanctions on Specially Designated Terrorists, including the ANO, Hezbollah, the DFLP, Hamas, and the PFLP.
Current	Clinton	March 15, 1995		Sanctions	Executive Order 12957	Prohibiting Certain Transactions with Respect to the Development of Iranian Petroleum Resources	Intended to prevent a business deal between Iran and Conoco.
Current	Clinton	October 21, 1995		Sanctions	Executive Order 12978	Blocking Assets and Prohibiting Transactions with Significant Narcotics Traffickers	Declared in response to Colombian drug cartels using American companies to launder money.
Current	Clinton	March 1, 1996		Maritime	Proclamation 6867	Declaration of a National Emergency and Invocation of Emergency Authority Relating to the Regulation of the Anchorage and Movement of Vessels	Implemented following the destruction of two civilian aircraft by the Cuban military on February 24, 1996.
Ended	Clinton	May 20, 1997	October 7, 2016	Sanctions	Executive Order 13047	Prohibiting New Investment in Burma	
Current	Clinton	November 3, 1997		Sanctions	Executive Order 13067	Blocking Sudanese Government Property and Prohibiting Transactions With Sudan	Established a trade embargo against Sudan, specifically targeting the Sudanese government.
Ended	Clinton	June 9, 1998	May 28, 2003	Sanctions	Executive Order 13088	Blocking Property of the Governments of the Federal Republic of Yugoslavia (Serbia and Montenegro), the Republic of Serbia, and the Republic of Montenegro, and Prohibiting New Investment in the Republic of Serbia in Response to the Situation in Kosovo	Declaration of a national emergency during the NATO bombing of Yugoslavia.
Ended	Clinton	July 4, 1999	July 2, 2002	Sanctions	Executive Order 13129	Blocking Property and Prohibiting Transactions With the Taliban	
Ended	Clinton	June 21, 2000	June 25, 2012	Sanctions	Executive Order 13159	Blocking Property of the Government of the Russian Federation Relating to the Disposition of Highly Enriched Uranium Extracted From Nuclear Weapons	
Ended	Clinton	January 18, 2001	January 15, 2004	Trade	Executive Order 13194	Prohibiting the Importation of Rough Diamonds From Sierra Leone	
Current	Bush	June 26, 2001		Sanctions	Executive Order 13219, Executive Order 13304	Blocking Property of Persons Who Threaten International Stabilization Efforts in the Western Balkans	Intended to combat extremist Albanian insurgents operating in North Macedonia and limit obstruction of the Dayton Accords. Amended on May 28, 2003, by Executive Order 13304 following the Ohrid Agreement, signed in 2001.
Current	Bush	August 17, 2001		Trade	Executive Order 13222, Executive Order 13637	Continuation of Export Control Regulations	Reasserted presidential control of exports of "defense articles" following the expiration of the Export Administration Act of 1979 in 1994. Amended on March 8, 2013, by Executive Order 13637 to delegate authority provided by Section 38 of the Arms Export Control Act from the president to the Secretary of State.
Current	Bush	September 14, 2001		Military	Proclamation 7463	Declaration of National Emergency by Reason of Certain Terrorist Attacks	The first of two national emergencies declared following the September 11 attacks, allowing the president to call troops from the National Guard or from retirement, to apportion military funding, to exercise more discretion over hiring military officers, and to promote more generals than previously allowed.
Current	Bush	September 23, 2001		Sanctions	Executive Order 13224	Blocking Property and Prohibiting Transactions With Persons Who Commit, Threaten To Commit, or Support Terrorism	The second of two national emergencies declared following the September 11 attacks, allowing the State and Treasury departments (through the Treasury's Office of Foreign Assets Control) to designate entities as terrorists and apply economic sanctions. Due to the order's broad language, its scope has grown over the years to become one of the Treasury's "cornerstone sanctions programs" in fighting terrorism worldwide. Amended on July 2, 2002 (Executive Order 13268) to include the Taliban, and on January 23, 2003 (Executive Order 13284) to integrate the newly created position of Secretary of Homeland Security into the order's process.
Ended	Bush	March 6, 2003	March 4, 2024	Sanctions	Executive Order 13288	Blocking Property of Persons Undermining Democratic Processes or Institutions in Zimbabwe	Imposed economic sanctions on Zimbabwe president Robert Mugabe and 76 other government officials following years of rigged elections and a recent food shortage, echoing similar sanctions imposed the previous year by the European Union. Amended on November 22, 2005 (Executive Order 13391) to revise the EO's annex listing the individuals targeted with sanctions.
Current	Bush	May 22, 2003		Legal	Executive Order 13303	Protecting the Development Fund for Iraq and Certain Other Property in Which Iraq Has an Interest	Granted the Development Fund for Iraq, established the same day, legal protection in the wake of the invasion of Iraq and amidst the Iraq War.
Ended	Bush	May 11, 2004	July 1, 2025	Sanctions	Executive Order 13338	Blocking Property of Certain Persons and Prohibiting the Export of Certain Goods to Syria	Imposed mostly symbolic economic sanctions on Syria, grounding all flights between the two countries, banning all exports to Syria but food and medicine, and freezing some Syrians' assets.
Ended	Bush	July 22, 2004	November 12, 2015	Sanctions	Executive Order 13348	Blocking Property of Certain Persons and Prohibiting the Importation of Certain Goods from Liberia	
Ended	Bush	February 7, 2006	September 14, 2016	Sanctions	Executive Order 13396	Blocking Property of Certain Persons Contributing to the Conflict in Côte d'Ivoire	
Current	Bush	June 16, 2006		Sanctions	Executive Order 13405	Blocking Property of Certain Persons Undermining Democratic Processes or Institutions in Belarus	Imposed sanctions, including a travel ban, on Alexander Lukashenko after Belarus's crackdown on peaceful protests against the recent presidential election and following similar sanctions by the European Union.
Current	Bush	October 27, 2006		Sanctions	Executive Order 13413	Blocking Property of Certain Persons Contributing to the Conflict in the Democratic Republic of the Congo	Imposed economic sanctions on DRC government officials amidst widespread violence taking place during runoffs for Congo's first free election in decades.
Current	Bush	August 1, 2007		Sanctions	Executive Order 13441	Blocking Property of Persons Undermining the Sovereignty of Lebanon or Its Democratic Processes and Institutions	Imposed sanctions intended as a warning to Syria and Hezbollah, months after a similar travel ban, during widespread unrest in the country, and out of concern over rifts between prime minister Fouad Siniora and president Émile Lahoud.
Current	Bush	June 26, 2008		Sanctions	Executive Order 13466	Continuing Certain Restrictions With Respect to North Korea and North Korean Nationals	Retained "certain restrictions" on North Korea as the United States removed North Korea from its list of state sponsors of terrorism and as North Korea publicly declared its nuclear program.
Ended	Obama	October 24, 2009	October 23, 2010	Public health	Proclamation 8443	Declaration of a National Emergency With Respect to the 2009 H1N1 Influenza Pandemic	Empowered the secretary of Health and Human Services to issue waivers allowing overcrowded hospitals to move swine flu patients to satellite facilities or other hospitals. Months before this national emergency was declared, on April 26, 2009, Obama's acting director of Health and Human Services declared H1N1 a public health emergency. Later on October 24, 2009, a second declaration was made by Obama to temporarily waive or modify certain requirements of the Medicare, Medicaid, and State Children's Health Insurance programs and of the Health Insurance Portability and Accountability Act Privacy Rule.
Current	Obama	April 12, 2010		Sanctions	Executive Order 13536	Blocking Property of Certain Persons Contributing to the Conflict in Somalia	Intended to help combat Somali pirates.
Current	Obama	February 25, 2011		Sanctions	Executive Order 13566	Blocking Property and Prohibiting Certain Transactions Related to Libya	Imposed sanctions on Muammar Gaddafi, his family, and Libyan officials after protestors were killed by government forces, including freezing assets and consideration of prosecution for war crimes.
Current	Obama	July 24, 2011		Sanctions	Executive Order 13581	Blocking Property of Transnational Criminal Organizations	Levied sanctions against four criminal organizations—Los Zetas, the Brothers' Circle, the Yakuza, and the Camorra—including freezing assets, barring ownership of American real estate, and implementing travel bans.
Current	Obama	May 16, 2012		Sanctions	Executive Order 13611	Blocking Property of Persons Threatening the Peace, Security, or Stability of Yemen	Intended to counter unrest in Yemen in the aftermath of the Yemeni Revolution.
Ended	Obama	June 25, 2012	May 26, 2015	Sanctions	Executive Order 13617	Blocking Property of the Government of the Russian Federation Relating to the Disposition of Highly Enriched Uranium Extracted From Nuclear Weapons	Imposed sanctions on Russia over the disposal of highly enriched uranium.
Current	Obama	March 6, 2014		Sanctions	Executive Order 13660	Blocking Property of Certain Persons Contributing to the Situation in Ukraine	Imposed sanctions, including restricting visas, in concert with the European Union and the international community against Russia after its Annexation of Crimea by the Russian Federation. Amended on March 16, 2014 (Executive Order 13661), March 20, 2014 (Executive Order 13662), and December 19, 2014 (Executive Order 13685) to expand the scope of sanctions.
Current	Obama	April 3, 2014		Sanctions	Executive Order 13664	Blocking Property of Certain Persons With Respect to South Sudan	Enabled economic sanctions to be placed due to the civil war in South Sudan; sanctions were first imposed a month later.
Current	Obama	May 12, 2014		Sanctions	Executive Order 13667	Blocking Property of Certain Persons Contributing to the Conflict in the Central African Republic	Imposed sanctions against former Central African Republic president François Bozizé, following similar sanctions placed on Bozizé by the United Nations Security Council the previous week; also contains provisions against the use of child soldiers.
Current	Obama	March 8, 2015		Sanctions	Executive Order 13692	Blocking Property and Suspending Entry of Certain Persons Contributing to the Situation in Venezuela	Imposed sanctions on seven high-ranking Venezuelan government officials, including SEBIN director Gustavo Enrique González López, PNB director Manuel Perez, and CVG head Justo Noguero.
Current	Obama	April 1, 2015		Sanctions	Executive Order 13694	Blocking the Property of Certain Persons Engaging in Significant Malicious Cyber-Enabled Activities	Intended to allow sanctions to be levied on foreign individuals determined by the Department of the Treasury to have engaged in cyber-crime or cyber-terrorism; was in the works for two years.
Ended	Obama	November 22, 2015	November 18, 2021	Sanctions	Executive Order 13712	Blocking Property of Certain Persons Contributing to the Situation in Burundi	Imposed sanctions on four Burundi nationals—minister of public security Alain Guillaume Bunyoni, National Police of Burundi deputy director-general Godefroid Bizimana, Godefroid Niyombare, and Cyrille Ndayirukiye—in the wake of widespread unrest.
Current	Trump	December 20, 2017		Sanctions	Executive Order 13818	Blocking the Property of Persons Involved in Serious Human Rights Abuse or Corruption	Imposed sanctions due to the Rohingya conflict in Myanmar, specifically against general Maung Maung Soe; works in tandem with the Global Magnitsky Human Rights Accountability Act.
Current	Trump	September 12, 2018		Sanctions	Executive Order 13848	Imposing Certain Sanctions in the Event of Foreign Interference in a United States Election	Intended to enable automatic sanctions in response to election interference; intelligence agencies are given 45 days after an election to assess any possible interference.
Current	Trump	November 27, 2018		Sanctions	Executive Order 13851	Blocking Property of Certain Persons Contributing to the Situation in Nicaragua	Announces certain sanctions against current and former Daniel Ortega government officials engaging in human rights abuse or corruption.
Ended	Trump	February 15, 2019	January 20, 2021	Military	Proclamation 9844	Declaring a National Emergency Concerning the Southern Border of the United States	Seeks to divert $8 billion of funds, which were previously allocated to other programs, to build a wall on the southern border of the United States, which the order calls a "major entry point for criminals, gang members, and illicit narcotics" into the United States. This emergency declaration is the first since the passage of the National Emergencies Act in which the president sought to take funds for which Congress previously denied appropriation, and the first time both houses of Congress passed a resolution declaring the emergency terminated, sending it to the president for his signature. The resolution passed, but failed to acquire the two thirds support in both houses of congress needed to override a veto. It was subsequently vetoed and failed to become law.
Current	Trump	May 15, 2019		Sanctions	Executive Order 13873	Securing the Information and Communications Technology and Services Supply Chain	Bans American companies from using any telecommunications equipment that the secretary of Commerce declares to be a national security risk. Soon after the executive order was signed, the Bureau of Industry and Security (BIS) of the Department of Commerce announced that it will be adding Huawei Technologies Co. Ltd and 70 affiliates to its Entity List. The Department of Commerce alleged that Huawei was engaged in activities that are contrary to US national security or foreign policy interest. As a result, sale or transfer of American technology to a company or person on the Entity List requires a license issued by the BIS, and a license may be denied if the sale or transfer would harm US national security or foreign policy interests.
Current	Trump	July 26, 2019		Sanctions	Executive Order 13882	Blocking Property and Suspending Entry of Certain Persons Contributing to the Situation in Mali	Freezes property and suspends entry to the United States of persons who threaten the peace and security of Mali, and prohibits making donations to such persons.
Current	Trump	October 14, 2019		Sanctions	Executive Order 13894	Blocking Property and Suspending Entry of Certain Persons Contributing to the Situation in Syria	Imposes sanctions against persons involved in war-time actions of the Bashar al-Assad government during the Syrian Civil War, or who obstruct postwar stabilization. (Repurposed in 2025 from an emergency that targeted Turkey)
Ended	Trump	March 13, 2020	April 10, 2023	Public health	Proclamation 9994	Declaring a National Emergency Concerning the Novel Coronavirus Disease (COVID-19) Outbreak	On March 13, 2020, President Donald Trump declared that he would give the states and territories access to up to 50 billion dollars in federal funds to fight the COVID-19 pandemic. This includes the ability to waive laws to enable tele-health. Stated by President Trump: "It gives remote doctor's visits and hospital check ins. The power to waive certain federal license requirements so the doctors from other states can provide services in states with the greatest need." On April 10, 2023, three years after the emergency declaration, Congress sent a Joint Resolution terminating the national emergency to the President's desk, at which point it was signed into law. This marks the first time since the passage of the National Emergencies Act that a National Emergency was terminated through Congressional action.
Ended	Trump	May 1, 2020	May 1, 2021	Economic	Executive Order 13920	Securing the United States Bulk-Power System	
Ended	Trump	June 11, 2020	April 1, 2021	Sanctions	Executive Order 13928	Blocking Property of Certain Persons Associated with the International Criminal Court	Freezes property of persons directly engaged in, or materially supporting, any effort by the ICC to investigate, arrest, detain or prosecute US or US-allied personnel in connection with the War in Afghanistan; bars entry into the US by such directly engaged persons and their immediate families.
Ended	Trump	July 14, 2020	July 14, 2026	Sanctions	Executive Order 13936	The President’s Executive Order on Hong Kong Normalization	Freezes property of persons involved in the implementation of the Hong Kong national security law by the People's Republic of China.
Ended	Trump	September 30, 2020	September 30, 2021	Economic	Executive Order 13953	Addressing the Threat to the Domestic Supply Chain From Reliance on Critical Minerals From Foreign Adversaries and Supporting the Domestic Mining and Processing Industries	
Current	Trump	November 12, 2020		Sanctions	Executive Order 13959	Addressing the Threat From Securities Investments That Finance Communist Chinese Military Companies	Prohibits transactions in securities and derivatives of military companies in the People's Republic of China.
Current	Biden	February 10, 2021		Sanctions	Executive Order 14014	Blocking Property with Respect to the Situation in Burma	Freezes property of and denies entry to persons involved in the 2021 Myanmar coup d'état and their immediate families, and likewise for all businesses operating in Myanmar's defense sector or controlled by the Myanmar military.
Current	Biden	April 15, 2021		Sanctions	Executive Order 14024	Blocking Property with Respect to Specified Harmful Foreign Activities of the Government of the Russian Federation	Freezes the property of persons involved in cyber and other threats coming from Russian government.
Current	Biden	September 17, 2021		Sanctions	Executive Order 14046	Imposing Sanctions on Certain Persons With Respect to the Humanitarian and Human Rights Crisis in Ethiopia	Imposes sanctions on individuals threatening the stability in Ethiopia or undermining democratic processes or institutions in Ethiopia or its territorial integrity.
Current	Biden	December 15, 2021		Sanctions	Executive Order 14059	Imposing Sanctions on Foreign Persons Involved in the Global Illicit Drug Trade	Authorizes the Secretary of the Treasury to issue sanctions on persons who have engaged in activities that contributed to the international trade of illegal drugs or gained property that was from or caused those drug trading activities.
Current	Biden	February 11, 2022		Seizure	Executive Order 14064	Protecting Certain Property of Da Afghanistan Bank for the Benefit of the People of Afghanistan	Requires the transfer of all US-held assets of Da Afghanistan Bank to an account at the Federal Reserve Bank of New York.
Current	Biden	April 21, 2022		Security	Proclamation 10371	Invocation of Emergency Authority Relating to the Regulation of the Anchorage and Movement of Russian-Affiliated Vessels to United States Ports	Prohibits Russian-affiliated vessels from entering into United States ports, except those ships that transport source material, special nuclear material, and nuclear byproduct material, or provide humanitarian aid.
Current	Biden	July 19, 2022		Sanctions	Executive Order 14078	Bolstering Efforts To Bring Hostages and Wrongfully Detained United States Nationals Home	
Current	Biden	August 9, 2023		Sanctions	Executive Order 14105	Addressing United States Investments in Certain National Security Technologies and Products in Countries of Concern	Directs the Secretary of the Treasury to issue regulations that monitor or prohibit transactions that may help China develop technology to counter US national security capabilities
Ended	Biden	February 1, 2024	January 20, 2025	Sanctions	Executive Order 14115	Imposing Certain Sanctions on Persons Undermining Peace, Security, and Stability in the West Bank	Prohibits transactions involving property of foreign persons who participate in activities that threaten the peace and security of the West Bank, including settler violence against Palestinian civilians; suspends entry of such persons into the U.S.
Current	Trump	January 20, 2025		Security	Proclamation 10886	Declaring a National Emergency at the Southern Border of the United States	Directing Secretary of Defense to redirect as many military units as needed to aid the Secretary of Homeland Security in achieving full control of the United States' southern border and take all legal measures possible to deny physical entry into the United States of all illegal migrants. The order also orders the Departments of Defense and Homeland Security to start construction for additional physical barriers on the southern border.
Current	Trump	January 20, 2025		Economic	Executive Order 14156	Declaring a National Energy Emergency	Directs federal agencies to use emergency authorities to facilitate acquisition and exploitation of domestic energy resources, and orders the Secretary of the Army to report possible actions to facilitate the national energy supply
Current	Trump	January 20, 2025		Economic	Executive Order 14157	Designating Cartels and Other Organizations as Foreign Terrorist Organizations and Specially Designated Global Terrorists	
Current	Trump	Feb 1, 2025		Economic	Executive Order 14193	Imposing Duties to Address the Flow of Illicit Drugs Across Our Northern Border	Imposes tariffs on imports from Canada (Note: Although the Supreme Court in Learning Resources, Inc. v. Trump ruled that imposing tariffs is not within the authority of the International Emergency Economic Powers Act, these emergencies remain active and additionally cite the Trade Act of 1974 as a basis for adjusting existing tariffs.)
Current	Trump	Feb 1, 2025		Economic	Executive Order 14194	Imposing Duties to Address the Situation at Our Southern Border	Imposes tariffs on imports from Mexico
Current	Trump	Feb 1, 2025		Economic	Executive Order 14195	Imposing Duties to Address the Synthetic Opioid Supply Chain in the People's Republic of China	Imposes tariffs on imports from China
Current	Trump	Feb 6, 2025		Sanctions	Executive Order 14203	Imposing Sanctions on the International Criminal Court	
Current	Trump	April 2, 2025		Economic	Executive Order 14257	Regulating Imports with a Reciprocal Tariff to Rectify Trade Practices that Contribute to Large and Persistent Annual United States Goods Trade Deficits	Imposes "reciprocal tariffs" of 10% or more on imports
Current	Trump	July 30, 2025		Sanctions	Executive Order 14323	Addressing Threats to the United States by the Government of Brazil	Imposes a 40% tariff on Brazilian goods
Current	Trump	January 9, 2026		Sanctions	Executive Order 14373	Safeguarding Venezuelan oil revenue for the good of the American and Venezuelan people	Preventing Venezuelan oil funds in U.S. treasury accounts from being seized through judicial processes.
Current	Trump	January 29, 2026		Sanctions	Executive Order 14380	Addressing Threats to the United States by the Government of Cuba	Allows for the imposition of additional tariffs on countries that supply oil to Cuba.
Current	Trump	August 26, 2026		Sanctions	Executive Order 14420	Declaring a National Emergency to Secure the United States Bulk-Power System	Prohibits transactions in bulk electric power system equipment that pose an operational or security risk

== See also ==
- Report of the Special Committee on the Termination of the National Emergency
