= Federal Emergency Plan D-Minus =

Nuclear attack response plan by the U.S. government during 1950s

Federal Emergency Plan D-Minus was a plan developed by the United States in the 1950s to guide the federal government in the immediate aftermath of a catastrophic nuclear attack. Plan D-Minus was part of the National Plan for Emergency Preparedness, which also included Mobilization Plan C (providing direction for federal planning in the three weeks prior to a global nuclear war).

== The Plan ==
Federal Emergency Plan D-Minus was designed for activation in the aftermath of an attack of "devastating" nature. It envisioned a scenario based on what was described as a major attack against the United States involving detonation of several hundred nuclear warheads.

Plan D-Minus assumed a nuclear attack against the continental United States resulting in 48 million immediate fatalities and a significant number of non-fatal casualties. Primary government command and control facilities, such as the White House and the Pentagon, would be destroyed and emergency relocation facilities would be rendered minimally operable as a result of physical damage and the effects of radiation sickness on staff. At the same time, nothing but critical communications would survive and even those would be crippled due to action by enemy saboteurs. Industrial and agricultural production would be severely disrupted, society would fragment into local gangs, and the financial system would completely collapse.

Immediately following an attack under D-Minus conditions, the National Security Council's Office of Emergency Planning would initiate and then decentralize its primary post-attack programs, including anti-hoarding and resource conservation measures, to those state and local governments that remained functioning. Meanwhile, emergency federal departments responsible for the most critical aspects of recovery would be formed and staffed from the "Executive Reserve," a 1,700-person group of public sector employees who had previously received specialized management training. Heads of emergency departments were private sector subject-matter specialists who had been chosen in advance. A series of pre-drafted executive orders would be immediately signed by the President of the United States authorizing extraordinary measures, including preventative detention of persons on the FBI Security Index and suspension of publication of the Federal Register.

== Exercise Spade Fork ==
Exercise Spade Fork, a training exercise simulating D-Minus conditions, was run from September 6, 1962, to September 27, 1962, concluding just weeks before the Cuban Missile Crisis. In the Spade Fork scenario, the first weapon to hit the United States was a decapitation strike at the president's Hammersmith Farm residence in Newport, Rhode Island. The exercise was timed to coincide with the command post exercise High Heels II, the military parallel to the civilian Spade Fork.

Though long-planned to test nuclear war preparedness, the exercises were modified on September 17 by Gen. Herbert B. Powell to provide cover for the mobilization of units of the Fourth United States Army for deployment to Mississippi, whose governor was then resisting a court order to desegregate the University of Mississippi.

== Supersession ==
Federal Emergency Plan D-Minus was rendered redundant due to changing conditions and assumptions about the nature of nuclear war. It was replaced in the mid-1960s by the Digest of Federal Emergency Measures. The digest, unlike Plan D-Minus, offered a set of scalable responses based on a continuum of destructive scenarios.

== See also ==
- Documents for Contingencies (Other than a Plan D Situation) Which Justify Application of Emergency Measures on a National Scale
- Eisenhower Ten
- Post-Attack Command and Control System
- Presidential Emergency Action Documents
