= National Emergencies Act =

1976 U.S. legislation

- Long title: An Act to terminate certain authorities with respect to national emergencies still in effect, and to provide for orderly implementation and termination of future national emergencies.
- Acronyms (colloquial): NEA
- Enacted by: the 94th United States Congress
- Effective: September 14, 1976

Citations
- Public law: 94-412
- Statutes at Large: 90 Stat. 1255

Codification
- Titles amended: 50 U.S.C.: War and National Defense
- U.S.C. sections created: 50 U.S.C. ch. 34 § 1601 et seq.

Legislative history
- Introduced in the House as H.R. 3884 by Peter W. Rodino (D–NJ) on February 27, 1975; Committee consideration by House Judiciary, Senate Government Operations; Passed the House on September 4, 1975 (388–5); Passed the Senate on August 27, 1976 (passed); Signed into law by President Gerald Ford on September 14, 1976

The National Emergencies Act (NEA) (Pub. L. 94–412, 90 Stat. 1255, enacted September 14, 1976, codified at 50 U.S.C. § 1601–1651) is a United States federal law enacted to end all previous national emergencies and to formalize the emergency powers of the president.

The Act empowers the president to activate special powers during a crisis but imposes certain procedural formalities when invoking such powers. The perceived need for the law arose from the scope and number of laws granting special powers to the executive in times of national emergency. Congress can terminate an emergency declaration with a joint resolution enacted into law. Powers available when the President declares a national emergency under this Act are limited to the 137 emergency powers Congress has defined by law.

The legislation was signed by President Gerald Ford on September 14, 1976. As of March 2020, 60 national emergencies have been declared, more than 30 of which remain in effect.

== Background ==
The first president to declare a national emergency was President Abraham Lincoln, during the American Civil War. The first president to issue an emergency proclamation was Woodrow Wilson, who on February 5, 1917, issued the following:

I have found that there exists a national emergency arising from the insufficiency of maritime tonnage to carry the products of the farms, forests, mines and manufacturing industries of the United States, to their consumers abroad and within the United States ....

This proclamation was within the limits of the act that established the United States Shipping Board. Starting with Franklin D. Roosevelt in 1933, presidents asserted the power to declare emergencies without limiting their scope or duration, without citing the relevant statutes, and without congressional oversight. The Supreme Court in Youngstown Sheet & Tube Co. v. Sawyer limited what a president could do in such an emergency, but did not limit the emergency declaration power itself. A 1973 Senate investigation found (in Senate Report 93-549) that four declared emergencies remained in effect: the 1933 banking crisis with respect to the hoarding of gold, a 1950 emergency with respect to the Korean War, a 1970 emergency regarding a postal workers strike, and a 1971 emergency in response to inflation. Many provisions of statutory law are contingent on a declaration of national emergency, as many as 500 by one count. It was due in part to concern that a declaration of "emergency" for one purpose should not invoke every possible executive emergency power, that Congress in 1976 passed the National Emergencies Act.

Presidents have continued to use their emergency authority, but from 1976 they did so subject to the provisions of the NEA. 42 national emergencies were declared between 1976 and 2007. Most of these were for the purpose of restricting trade with certain foreign entities under the International Emergency Economic Powers Act (IEEPA) (50 U.S.C. 1701–1707).

== Provisions ==
=== Termination of presidential authority ===
A prior Senate investigation had found 470 provisions of federal law that a President might invoke via a declaration of emergency. The Act repealed several of these provisions and stated that prior emergency declarations would no longer give force to those provisions that remained. Congress did not attempt to revoke any outstanding emergency declarations per se, as it determined that these remained the President's prerogative under Article Two of the United States Constitution.

=== Procedure for new emergencies and rescinding emergency declarations ===
The Act authorizes the President to activate emergency provisions of law via an emergency declaration on the condition that the President specifies the provisions so activated and notifies Congress. An activation would expire if the President expressly terminated the emergency, or did not renew the emergency annually, or if each house of Congress passed a resolution terminating the emergency. After presidents objected to this "Congressional termination" provision on separation of powers grounds, and the Supreme Court in INS v. Chadha (1983) held such provisions to be an unconstitutional legislative veto, it was replaced in 1985 with termination by an enacted joint resolution. A joint resolution passed by both chambers requires presidential signature, giving the president veto power over the termination (requiring a two-thirds majority in both houses in the case of a contested termination).

The Act also requires the President and executive agencies to maintain records of all orders and regulations that proceed from use of emergency authority, and to regularly report the cost incurred to Congress.

=== Exceptions ===
Certain emergency authorities were exempted from the act at the time of its passage:

- 10 USC 2304(a)(1) – allowing exemption of national defense contracts from competitive bidding
- 10 USC 3313, 6386(c) and 8313 – regulating the promotion, retirement and separation of military officers
- 12 USC 95(a) – regulating transactions in foreign gold and silver
- 40 USC 278(b) – regulating federal property purchases and contracts
- 41 USC 15 and 203 – limiting the assignment of claims against the federal government
- 50 USC 1431–1435 – enabling the President to make national defense contracts outside of otherwise applicable rules

The list of exceptions has from time to time been revised. For example, Public Law 95-223 (1977) repealed the emergency clause of 12 USC 95(a) and arranged for its authority to expire according to the normal provisions of the NEA.

== Emergency powers ==
Congress has delegated at least 150 distinct statutory emergency powers to the President, each available upon the declaration of an emergency. Only 13 of these require a declaration from Congress; the remaining 137 are assumed by an executive declaration with no further Congressional input.

Congressionally-authorized emergency presidential powers are sweeping and dramatic, and range from suspending all laws regulating chemical and biological weapons, including the ban on human testing (50 U.S.C. § 1515, passed 1969); to suspending any Clean Air Act implementation plan or excess emissions penalty upon petition of a state governor (42 U.S.C. (f) § 7410 (f), passed 1977); to authorizing military construction projects (10 U.S.C. (a) § 2808 (a), passed 1982) using any existing defense appropriations for such military constructions ($10.4 billion in FY2018); to drafting any retired Coast Guard officers (14 U.S.C. § 331, passed 1963) or enlisted members (14 U.S.C. § 359, passed 1949) into active duty regardless of ineligibility for Selective Service.

== Invocations ==
As of April 2025, 90 national emergencies have been declared, with 49 of them being renewed annually. These include the eight that were declared prior to the passage of the 1976 Act. The longest continuing national emergency dates back to November 1979 by the Carter administration freezing Iranian government property under the International Emergency Economic Powers Act.

Since passage of the National Emergencies Act in 1976, every U.S. President has declared multiple national emergencies: Carter (2); Reagan (6); H.W. Bush (4); Clinton (17); W. Bush (12); Obama (13); Trump (11); Biden (9); Trump (8 as of April 2025).

== Other emergency frameworks ==
Beyond the National Emergencies Act, Congress has established four other emergency power frameworks:

- 42 U.S.C. § 247d – Public Health Service Act (1944), as amended.
- 42 U.S.C. § 5121 et seq. – Stafford Act (1988), replacing the Disaster Relief Act of 1974, as amended in 2000 and 2006.
- 22 U.S.C. § 2318(a)(1) – Foreign Assistance Act of 1961, as amended, including by the Arms Export Control Act (1962)
- Draft amendments to the Defense Production Act, by means of enactment of individual Titles within the draft Defense Resources Act. Titles include censorship and economic stabilization (price controls). Congress and the president have leave to approve all or parts of the text of either Act and to contract or expand proposed authorities therein. In some respects, Titles within the Defense Resources Act mirror the Public Health Service Act.

== See also ==
- List of national emergencies in the United States
- Continuity of Government Plan
- National Security and Homeland Security Presidential Directive
- Rex 84
- United States national emergency with respect to Iran
- International Emergency Economic Powers Act
- Presidential Emergency Action Documents
