= War Claims Act of 1948 =

- Long title: AN ACT To amend the Trading with the Enemy Act, as amended; to create a commission to make an inquiry and report with respect to war claims; and to provide for relief for internees in certain cases
- Enacted by: the 80th United States Congress
- Effective: July 3, 1948

Citations
- Public law: Pub. L. 80–896
- Statutes at Large: 62 Stat. 1240

Legislative history
- Introduced in the House as H.R. 4960; Passed the House on; Passed the Senate on; Signed into law by President Harry S. Truman on

The War Claims Act of 1948, or Public Law 80-896 (62 Stat. 1240; 50 U.S.C.), is a United States federal law passed by the 80th United States Congress on July 3, 1948.

== Synopsis ==
It created the War Claims Commission to adjudicate claims and pay out compensation to American prisoners of war and civilian internees of World War II. It authorized ten prisoner of war and civilian internee compensation programs, and four war damage and loss compensation programs. Payments and administrative expenses for all but three of the programs were paid by the liquidation of Japanese and German assets seized by the U.S. after World War II. Payments to prisoners of war were at the rate of US$1 to $2.50 per day of imprisonment, payments to civilian internees of Japan amounted to $60 for each month of internment. Civilians were also eligible for compensation for disability or death. The act did not authorize compensation for civilian internees held by Germany.

The Act also added Section 39 to the Trading with the Enemy Act 1917, to the effect that no compensation should be paid for property confiscated after 17 December 1941.

== See also ==
- War Powers Act of 1941
