= Defense Production Act of 1950 =

United States law

Defense Production Act
- Long title: An Act to establish a system of priorities and allocations for materials and facilities, authorize the requisitioning thereof, provide financial assistance for expansion of productive capacity and supply, provide for price and wage stabilization, provide for the settlement of labor disputes, strengthen controls over credit, and by these measures facilitate the production of goods and services necessary for the national security, and for other purposes
- Enacted by: the 81st United States Congress
- Effective: September 8, 1950

Citations
- Public law: 81-774
- Statutes at Large: 64 Stat. 798

Codification
- Titles amended: 50 U.S.C.: War and National Defense
- U.S.C. sections created: 50 U.S.C. Chapter 55

Legislative history
- Introduced in the House as H.R. 9176

The Defense Production Act (DPA) of 1950 (Pub. L. 81–774) is a United States federal law enacted on September 8, 1950, in response to the start of the Korean War. It was part of a broad civil defense and war mobilization effort in the context of the Cold War. Its implementing regulations, the Defense Priorities and Allocation System (DPAS), are located at 15 CFR §§700 to 700.93. Since 1950, the act has been reauthorized over 50 times. It has been periodically amended and remains in force.

== Provisions ==
The Defense Production Act currently contains three major sections.

- Title I authorizes the President to identify specific goods as "critical and strategic" and to require private businesses to accept and prioritize contracts for these materials.
- Title III authorizes the President to establish mechanisms (such as regulations, orders or agencies) to allocate materials, services and facilities to promote national defense. This includes grants, loans, and purchase commitments to businesses create, maintain, protect, and expand the domestic industrial base capabilities necessary for national defense.
- Title VII authorizes the President to control the civilian economy so that scarce and critical materials necessary to the national defense effort are available for defense needs.

The original act included four other sections that expired and were repealed under current law. These allowed the president to seize private property under Title II; fix wages and prices and implement rationing of goods under Title IV; use force to settle labor disputes under Title V; and control real estate credit under Title VI. Although the president can no longer fix wages and prices of goods, the president can still order to prevent hoarding and selling of designated items "in excess of prevailing market prices" under Title I in section 102 of the act.

The president's designation of products under the jurisdiction of the DPA is the authority of the act most often used by the Department of Defense (DOD) since the 1970s. Most of the other functions of the act are administered by the Office of Strategic Industries and Economic Security (SIES) in the Bureau of Industry and Security in the Department of Commerce.

The Defense Priorities and Allocations System institutes a rating system for contracts and purchase orders. The highest priority is DX, which must be approved by the secretary of defense. The next level down is DO, and below that are unrated contracts.

Under section 721 of the act, an inter-agency committee known as the Committee on Foreign Investment in the United States (CFIUS) is authorized to investigate and review transactions involving foreign investment and/or real estate transactions by foreign persons and/or entities in the United States. Civil penalties may result in up to $250,000 per violation or the value of the transaction, whichever is greater, on any persons and/or entities that willfully violated CFIUS regulations, and any mitigation orders, conditions, or agreements imposed by CFIUS. The CFIUS serves as an administrative body to refer and advise the president should the transaction need to be rejected or limited. The law only grants the president the authorization and decision to reject or limit the transaction within a 15-day presidential review period.

== Amendments ==
The Defense Production Act (DPA) has undergone several amendments since it was first passed in 1950. These amendments have entailed alterations to its definition of "national defense." Four of the major amendments are described below:

1. In 1970, the existing definition of "national defense" was amended to include space activity, and the body of the legislation was edited to incorporate cost-accounting standards.
2. In 1980, the DPA was reauthorized to designate energy as a material good, making the resources and means for its generation obtainable with an invocation of the act.
3. In 1992, the DPA was amended to provide opportunities for small businesses to participate as contractors and subcontractors in initiatives directed by the act, allowing businesses of all sizes to be considered for accelerated production needs.
4. In 2003, an amendment to the DPA established "critical infrastructure protection and restoration" as a national security concern, and identified resources deemed necessary for creating radiation-hardened electronics a specific new category the DPA could be applied to.

Through continued reauthorization, the DPA has been permitted to enhance provision of civil transportation; energy; and food, health, and industrial resources, in the name of the national defense.

Related proposed legislation, never enacted, would have amended the Defense Production Act during national emergencies. Upon implementation by Congress, Defense Resources Act amendments to the DPA authorized the president to execute mobilization measures including price controls.

== Use ==
=== Korean War ===
The Defense Production Act was first used during the Korean War to establish a large defense mobilization infrastructure and bureaucracy. Under the authority of the act, President Harry S. Truman eventually established the Office of Defense Mobilization, instituted wage and price controls, strictly regulated production in heavy industries such as steel and mining, prioritized and allocated industrial materials in short supply, and ordered the dispersal of wartime manufacturing plants across the nation.

=== Cold War ===
The Defense Production Act played a vital role in the establishment of the domestic aluminum and titanium industries in the 1950s. Using the act, Department of Defense provided capital and interest-free loans, and directed mining and manufacturing resources as well as skilled laborers to these two processing industries. The DPA was also used in the 1950s to ensure that government-funded industries were geographically dispersed across the United States to prevent the industrial base from being destroyed by a single nuclear attack. During the late 1960s and early 1970s, the DPA increasingly was used to diversify the US energy mix by funding the trans-Alaskan pipeline, the US synthetic fuels corporation, and research into liquefied natural gas.

=== Technological innovation ===
Beginning in the 1980s, the Department of Defense (DOD) began using the contracting and spending provisions of the Defense Production Act to provide seed money to develop new technologies. The DOD has since used the act to help develop a number of new technologies and materials, including silicon carbide ceramics, indium phosphide and gallium arsenide semiconductors, microwave power tubes, radiation-hardened microelectronics, superconducting wire, metal composites and the mining and processing of rare earth minerals.

=== FEMA national security resource preparedness ===
In June 1994, President Bill Clinton invoked the Defense Production Act to implement national security resource preparedness during disasters under the advisement of the Federal Emergency Management Agency (FEMA) director. The order allows FEMA work with other federal departments to order producers and distributors to prioritize resources in preparation of and in times of disasters.

=== 21st century ===
==== California energy crisis ====
In January 2001, President Bill Clinton invoked the Defense Production Act to force gas suppliers to continue to supply Pacific Gas and Electric Company (PG&E), the largest California energy provider at the time, with gas regardless of loss as a result of suppliers shutting off gas supplies due to the PG&E's non-payment during the 2000–01 California electricity crisis. The order was later rescinded under the George W. Bush administration, but it resulted in the expansion of blackouts in California for several months and PG&E's bankruptcy.

==== Cyber espionage ====
In 2011, President Barack Obama invoked the Defense Production Act to force telecommunications companies, under criminal penalties, to provide detailed information to the Commerce Department's Bureau of Industry and Security on the use of foreign-manufactured hardware and software in the companies' networks, as part of efforts to combat Chinese cyberespionage.

==== Materials critical to national defense ====
On June 13, 2017, President Donald Trump invoked the Defense Production Act to classify two sets of products as "critical to national defense". The first referenced "items affecting aerospace structures and fibers, radiation-hardened microelectronics, radiation test and qualification facilities, and satellite components and assemblies". The second referenced "items affecting adenovirus vaccine production capability; high strength, inherently fire and ballistic resistant, co-polymer aramid fibers industrial capability; secure hybrid composite shipping container industrial capability; and three-dimensional ultra-high density microelectronics for information protection industrial capability".

==== COVID-19 pandemic ====
On March 18, 2020, in response to the COVID-19 outbreak in the United States, President Donald Trump invoked the Defense Production Act (DPA) through an executive order that defined ventilators and personal protective equipment as "essential to the national defense." Trump named Director of Trade and Manufacturing Policy Peter Navarro as the policy coordinator for using the DPA in response to the COVID-19 crisis, and designated Health and Human Services Secretary Alex Azar the authority to determine quantities of essential supplies.

Trump received criticism for not taking advantage of the DPA's capabilities sooner. Fifty-seven Democratic representatives in the House of Representatives sent a letter to Trump during the week prior, urging him to make use of the DPA for public health purposes, and Democratic speaker of the House Nancy Pelosi warned that "we must put more testing, more protective equipment, and more ventilators into the hands of our front-line workers immediately." On March 23, 2020, Trump issued an executive order classifying "health and medical resources necessary to respond to the spread of COVID-19" as subject to the authority granted by the DPA to prohibit hoarding and price gouging.

Automotive manufacturers such as General Motors (GM) and Ford Motor Co. were identified as private companies capable of focusing on ventilator production in response to the DPA. At the beginning of April 2020, Trump expanded his use of the DPA to require a total of six private companies, now including General Electric and Medtronic, to secure supplies to manufacture ventilators.

On April 28, 2020, Trump invoked the DPA with regards to the food supply chain, giving the United States Department of Agriculture as well as Agriculture Secretary Sonny Perdue the authority to require meat and poultry plants to maintain production. This order was also met with criticism over coronavirus safety concerns for workers at such plants.

On December 8, 2020, Trump claimed that he would invoke the DPA to produce vaccine doses, but he did not do so before the end of his term.

In January 2021, President Joe Biden invoked the DPA on his second day in office to increase production of supplies related to the pandemic, such as protective equipment. On March 2, Biden invoked the DPA again to supply equipment to Merck facilities needed to safely manufacture Johnson & Johnson vaccines.

==== Wildfire crisis ====
California experienced a severe wildfire season in 2021. In September of that year, President Biden invoked the Defense Production Act to increase the national production of fire hoses. NewView Oklahoma, a manufacturing company which provides accessible employment to visually impaired and blind workers, is the main producer of fire hoses for the United States Fire Service. Biden's use of the DPA restarted NewView Oklahoma's production, which had halted during the COVID-19 pandemic. As a result of invoking the DPA, over 21,000 new fire hoses were able to be manufactured and delivered to the frontlines in California.

==== Virginia-class attack submarines ====
In December 2021, President Biden invoked the Defense Production Act to scale production and provide the needed parts and labor training to support Virginia-class attack submarines.

==== Critical mineral supplies ====
In March 2022, President Biden invoked the Defense Production Act to increase the extraction of minerals deemed necessary for the clean energy transition in the United States, which include lithium, nickel, cobalt, graphite, and manganese used in large-capacity batteries for energy storage and electric vehicles. As defined by the United States Geological Survey, these minerals are "called critical or strategic owing to concerns about risk of supply interruption and the cost of such a disruption". The United States currently relies largely on foreign sources, such as China, Russia, South Africa, Brazil, and Canada, for the mining and processing of these metals.

Establishing a domestic supply of strategic and critical minerals has been regarded by the Biden Administration as necessary for promoting the national defense. The Administration's primary strategy for combating climate change involves reliance on critical minerals to create large-scale batteries intended to electrify transportation and energy sources.

The Biden Administration's energy transition agenda, facilitated by the DPA, has also created conflict amongst environmentalists. Some are in favor of capitalizing on minerals like lithium to quickly electrify the transportation industry, while others caution against mining due to the process's long-term consequences for ecosystems.

==== Baby formula shortage ====
On May 18, 2022, President Biden invoked the Defense Production Act in response to the 2022 United States infant formula shortage, requiring manufacturers to prioritize fulfilling orders of formula ingredients to key suppliers before fulfilling other orders. The United States Department of Health and Human Services and the United States Department of Agriculture were authorized to use Department of Defense aircraft to import formula to the United States from overseas as long as the formula met US health and safety standards.

==== Green energy ====
On June 6, 2022, President Biden invoked the Defense Production Act to accelerate domestic production of green energy technology. The administration responded to growing energy costs related to Russia's invasion of Ukraine. The invocation came along with a 2-year tariff exemption, ending in June 2024, on solar panels from Cambodia, Malaysia, Thailand, and Vietnam. The technology included in Biden's invocation included solar energy; transformers and electric grid components; heat pumps; insulation; and electrolyzers, fuel cells, and platinum group metals.

According to a 2023 assessment performed by the Massachusetts Institute of Technology and the Rhodium Group on behalf of the United States Department of the Treasury, which mapped American clean energy investments before and after the passing of the Inflation Reduction Act (IRA) in August 2022, these investments grew quickly in areas with a history of fossil fuel production. Communities in these areas have experienced prolonged and disproportionate exposure to pollutants generated by such processes, increasing their priority to benefit from the IRA's clean energy goals. The assessment also found that at its time of publication, 78% of the IRA-incentivized clean energy investments were intended for counties with below-average median household incomes. Their residents are intended to be earlier recipients of the five key energy technologies identified by the Biden Administration (solar; transformers and electric grid components; heat pumps; insulation; and electrolyzers, fuel cells, and platinum group metals).

On November 17, 2023, the US Department of Energy (DOE) announced $169 million funded by the IRA for nine projects at 15 sites to accelerate US-made electric heat pump manufacturing. On February 14, 2024, the DoE announced a further $63 million funded by the Inflation Reduction Act to accelerate the growth of domestic manufacturing of residential heat pumps, heat pump water heaters, and other heat pump systems and components.

The joint invocation of the DPA and the IRA was intended to advance the Justice40 Initiative, which aims to ensure that forty percent of the benefits (economic and otherwise) to come from federal investing in measures to halt climate change will be reaped by disadvantaged and marginalized communities. According to the DoE, heat pumps "efficiently provide comfortable temperatures for heating and cooling homes and businesses in all climates" and can facilitate consumer savings. The invocation will result in the creation of new jobs, mostly in manufacturing, in disadvantaged communities across the eastern half of the United States.

==== Hypersonic industrial base ====
On March 11, 2023, President Biden invoked the Defense Production Act to accelerate the rebuilding and expansion of the domestic industrial base on hypersonic technologies, which includes "airbreathing engines, advanced avionics position navigation and guidance systems, and constituent materials for hypersonic systems."

==== Printed circuit boards ====
On March 27, 2023, President Biden invoked the Defense Production Act to accelerate and assure the production capacity of "printed circuit boards and advanced packaging, their components, and the manufacturing systems that produce such systems and components."

==== Artificial intelligence ====
On October 30, 2023, President Biden invoked the Defense Production Act to "require that developers of the most powerful AI systems share their safety test results and other critical information with the U.S. government" when "developing any foundation model that poses a serious risk to national security, national economic security, or national public health."

==== Pharmaceutical supply chain ====
On November 27, 2023, President Biden announced he would invoke the Defense Production Act "to enable investment in domestic manufacturing of essential medicines, medical countermeasures, and critical inputs that have been deemed by the President as essential to the national defense." An initial investment of $35 million is identified by the Department of Health and Human Services for domestic production of materials utilized for sterile injectable medicines. In addition, the Department of Defense was instructed to issue a report on reducing reliance on foreign suppliers that are high-risk to pharmaceutical supply chain.

On December 27, 2023, Biden invoked the DPA for "essential medicines, medical countermeasures, and critical inputs."

== See also ==
- Nationalization
- War Powers Act of 1941
