= Defense Resources Act =

The Defense Resources Act (DRA) was draft emergency legislation of the United States government. A 1983 submission to Congress confirmed the existence of the plan. The present and prior status of the DRA proposal is not immediately certain.

== Background ==
Reagan Administration officials presented a draft plan of legislative text that could be submitted to Congress for approval during a national emergency, such as nuclear war. The decision to make such a request would be the prerogative of the president. Congress would be free to accept, modify or reject the proposals. If enacted into law, the DRA would amend the Defense Production Act (DPA).

These DRA and DPA enactments collectively would form the basis of a substantial part of Reagan's nuclear war and emergency plans. After enactment, the president would be free to sign orders and directives employing the approved legislation as a legal and statutory basis for presidential emergency powers. Such plans for legislation would coexist with a portfolio of other emergency action papers, including Presidential Emergency Action Documents and Other than a Plan D situation documents.

The table of contents of the proposed legislation calls for several Titles that would form the basis of key emergency authorities. Title X authorized the president to direct federal officials to employ limited international censorship of communications entering and leaving the USA. Other draft Titles authorized seizure of industrial plants and economic stabilization via price controls.

DPA proposals to Congress by Reagan staff employed significant constitutional safeguards. They do not contain a request for Congress to suspend per se any part of the Constitution. Sections of the law specifically address Fifth Amendment safeguards. Title X limits censorship to information entering or leaving the USA. It did not call for press censorship of domestic news. It should be remembered these plans contemplated nuclear war, in which many freedoms might be in grave wartime jeopardy as the nation fought for its existence.

Whether enacted as part of a war emergency or other non-military event, Congress at all times retained the constitutional authority to amend, revoke or modify these authorities, by veto override, should the contingency arise. The proposals did not limit oversight by the Congress or federal judiciary and Supreme Court of the United States, nor did they give the president unlimited or perpetual unilateral or unconstitutional power. However, scholars will need to examine this material in light of current jurisprudence.

The question of resolving conflicts between Congress and the White House over authority in these matters would presumably be up to federal courts. The president has inherent constitutional powers that may overlap some proposed plans and that do not derive from Congress. Similarly, presidential powers with respect to the Emergency Alert System would not exist without statute laws of Congress that authorize EAS.

Congress could cancel EAS if desired, leaving no FCC rules to carry out EAS presidential messages. Further, the president does not require approval from Congress as to his Commander in Chief powers, but Congress can limit presidential powers by revocation of funding. DPA amendments approved via DRA would simply grant or revoke authorization for the president to act, which he might or might not do. Further, the president is constrained by impeachment, should Congress decide the president abused his authorities. Lastly, all such plans require funding, the source and quantity of which in nuclear war is questionable. Parts of the DPA proposal address the Fifth Amendment mandate to compensate owners for seizure of private property.
