= War Powers Act =

Several acts passed by the United States Congress are known as the War Powers Act:

- the Trading with the Enemy Act of 1917
- the War Powers Act of 1941
- the War Powers Clause
- the War Powers Resolution of 1973
