= Presidential Emergency Action Documents =

Documents for the President of the United States

Presidential Emergency Action Documents (PEADs) are draft classified executive orders, proclamations, and messages to Congress that are prepared for the president of the United States to exercise or expand powers in anticipation of a range of emergency hypothetical worst-case scenarios, so that they are ready to sign and put into effect the moment one of those scenarios comes to pass. They are defined by the Federal Emergency Management Agency as the "Final drafts of Presidential messages, proposed legislation proclamations, and other formal documents, including DOJ-issued cover sheets addressed to the President, to be issued in event of a Presidentially-declared national emergency".

PEADs originated in the Eisenhower administration in response to fears of the Cold War and nuclear war, and are part of what is often referred to as Continuity of Government (COG) planning. Signed orders for a broad scope of issues were drafted and signed by the president intended to be used to prevent disruption of government functions. No PEADs have been declassified, publicly released, or leaked, and only a very limited number of PEADs are public knowledge, and only through secondary declassified documents that mention them. Of these the trend of the orders is toward a severe reduction of liberty and civil rights for American citizens. As of 2017 there were at least 56 PEADs, which the Office of Legal Counsel had worked on updating since 2012.

PEADs are obscure and generally unknown to average Americans, scholars and most executive branch officials, and are sometimes referred to as "secret powers" of the president. Some have also called into question their constitutional viability.

== History ==
=== Origins and implementation ===
PEADs and COG planning seems to have originated in the Eisenhower administration in an attempt to plan for the aftermath of a nuclear exchange with the Soviet Union and designed to be rapidly implemented to prevent disruption to Government services. Of these orders there were plans for relocating centers for government functions and suspending habeas corpus. They even called for the creation of new government agencies to be chaired by a mixture of both civilian businessmen and cabinet secretaries without any scope of their exact function or lifespan, the only focus being on their activation on the day of a nuclear attack. These new agencies included: The Office of Censorship, National Manpower Agency, and National Food Agency. These agencies were authorized to "requisition or condemn private property or its use," pursuant to act of Congress and/or executive order, and it was thought this would be necessary to rebuild the country and maintain law and order.

1983 draft emergency legislation, the Defense Resources Act (DRA), would have authorized the president to execute certain emergency actions and would have also amended the Defense Production Act. DRA's table of contents included industrial plant seizure (Title V), price controls (Title VII) and censorship (Title X).

Had there been an emergency where the president felt he needed to request authority from Congress to impose limited censorship, DRA provided him statutory legal authority to issue executive orders implementing censorship within federal agencies. In contrast, the president needs no additional statutory authority to use the Emergency Alert System, as Congress has already authorized these FCC EAS regulations. DRA Title X reads:

Whenever the President shall deem that the public safety demands it, he may cause to be censored under such rules and regulations as he may from time to time establish, communications by mail, cable radio, television or other means of transmission crossing the borders of the United States.

While no declassified PEAD exists, the DRA legislative draft text on censorship and other Presidential Emergency Actions is now in the public domain. The text of any such censorship PEAD would not be expected to exceed the grant of legislative authority within DRA Title X, based on present understanding. The 1983 draft does not propose suspension of the Constitution. Title II states its adherence to the Fifth Amendment. Congress is free to expand or contract authorities within DRA, subject to constraints within United States Constitution. DRA contains no constitutional suspension clauses per se.

Over time, the circumstances under which PEADs could be executed expanded to include events beyond nuclear warfare. One example is a 1968 FBI Memorandum from the Johnson administration. The memorandum recommended a "Priority Apprehension Program based on dangerousness[sic] of individuals on SI" referring to the government "Security Index," and noting that the government had "recently amended [its] definition of a dangerous person in new Presidential Emergency Action Document 6, broadening it to include terrorists or persons who would interfere with Government operation and defense effort [sic]"." This Security Index contained the names of individuals whom the government considered threats and should be immediately apprehended and detained to prevent sabotage, espionage, and insurrection and contained 10,000 names. Former Carter administration official referred to this as "The Enemies Briefcase".

In 1973, the Congressional Church Committee, attempted to uncover various unconstitutional acts by the Executive Branch in the wake of the Watergate scandal. This committee ended up finding copious amounts of evidence that presidents and their agents had routinely violated the Constitution going back to at least the Roosevelt administration. The conclusions of the Committee were that the president indeed could: “seize property and commodities, seize control of transport and communications, organize and control the means of production, assign military forces abroad, and restrict travel". They also revealed that States of Emergency had been implemented and remained permanent for decades. The Committee's findings were largely ignored by the public, as the Ford Administration did their best to thwart their activities, and a bill they eventually passed to terminate national emergencies after six months was completely ineffective and eventually forgotten. In 1977 Congress passed the International Emergency Economic Powers Act and the Office of Foreign Assets Control which expanded the president's ability to declare National Emergencies and implement unconstitutional policies.

No memoranda that are more recent than 1979 have been found that contain references to PEADs. However, CNN reported in 1991 that the Reagan administration had continued COG planning and revealed plans drafted by then vice president George H. W. Bush that included a separate line of succession to the presidency conflicting with the Constitution.

Subsequent investigations have revealed that the Clinton, Bush, and Obama administrations have continued COG planning and maintained previous PEADs or developed new ones. The Security Index is also still maintained, now known as "Main Core," and is reported to contain eight million names. Since February 2000 PEADs are retained by FEMA "permanent[ly,]" until "superseded obsolete".

=== Public awareness ===
Though there were academic articles and books discussing them since the 1980s, explicit public discussion about PEADS in the media did not begin until March 2020 when President Donald Trump said: "I have the right to do a lot of things that people don't even know about," during a White House press briefing with Prime Minister Leo Varadkar of Ireland leading to an April 10 op-ed in The New York Times by Elizabeth Goitein, co-director of the Liberty and National Security Program at NYU's Brennan Center for Justice entitled "Trump Has Emergency Powers We Aren't Allowed to Know About".

This led to several pieces in major news outlets such as CBS News, Politico, and Harper's Weekly, as well as former senior White House officials and Senators going public with what they know of PEADS, such as Former Colorado Senator Gary Hart, Mark Medish, a senior National Security Council director under Clinton, and Joel McCleary, a White House official in the Carter Administration.

Comments from Trump, suggesting sweeping powers unrestricted by Congress or the courts, conflict with precedent in the historic record. President Ronald Reagan's staff briefed Congress on emergency plans. They explained Reagan might request emergency authorities, such as price controls and seizures of industrial facilities, if needed in an emergency. These were requests, not unilateral commands, and they contained protections for constitutional rights including the Fifth Amendment to the United States Constitution.

== Legislation ==
On July 22, 2020 a Senate bill, S.4279 or The REIGN Act of 2020, was introduced by Senator Edward J. Markey that was the first piece of draft legislation to directly acknowledge PEADs, making reference to 56 documents described as "presidential emergency action documents" in the budget justification materials for the Office of Legal Counsel of the Department of Justice submitted to Congress in support of the budget of the president for fiscal year 2018. The bill’s sole purpose was to legislate PEADs. The bill would have forced the president to submit any PEAD that went into effect to congressional scrutiny within 30 days. Active PEADs would have to be mostly declassified within 180 days, and any parts considered too sensitive to declassify would have to be summarized in a public report. Finally, any documents in effect when the legislation passed would also have to be declassified or summarized. The REIGN Act ultimately died in committee at the end of the 116th Congress.

On September 30, 2021, a bipartisan bill, known as H.R. 5410 or The National Security Reforms and Accountability Act (NSRAA), that borrows most of the language from the REIGN Act relating to PEADs, was introduced in the House by James P. McGovern, chairman of the House Rules Committee, and Peter Meijer, ranking member of the United States Senate Appropriations Subcommittee on Homeland Security. The bill's stated purpose was "To provide for clarification and limitations with respect to the exercise of national security powers, and for other purposes". The bill died in committee at the end of the 117th Congress.

Sections on disclosing PEADs have been reproduced in subsequent draft legislation, including H.R. 5048 (otherwise known as the Protecting Our Democracy Act) in the 118th Congress, which died in committee, and H.R. 8831 (otherwise known as the Protecting Our Democracy Act) in the 119th Congress.

== Controversies ==
A 2020 Harper's article presented a number of controversies. It described efforts by former senator Gary Hart to obtain plans said to be secretive and obscure. While this may be true of some plans, it was not true of all. Hart had access to briefings in the Congressional Record. These printed briefings had no classification markings and have been in the public domain approximately five decades.

The Brennan Center for Justice has said that "we do not know what PEADs contain today" but that in the past, they have been known to include suspension of the writ of habeas corpus, which the Constitution authorises in times of emergency, although most sources agree that only Congress can perform such an action.

On June 22, 2026, The Nation published an article arguing that the second Trump administration was deliberately engaging in incremental steps to destroy US democracy and argued they may later use PEADS to consolidate power:

Political prisons, a domestic army, control of the military’s legal apparatus, the seizure of voter rolls, and much more presage the potential declaration of a national crisis and the implementation of various of the President’s Emergency Action Documents (PEADS). [...] Unless we begin to act with resolve, fortitude, and clear-eyed commitment to our democracy, a future election will be lost, and our democracy will likely be destroyed by a presidential declaration of a national emergency and the subsequent implementation of the emergency measures found in the PEADS, not authorized by law but drafted and implemented without any congressional oversight."

== See also ==
- Other than a Plan D situation
