= Justice40 =

Racial and economic equity program under the Biden administration

Justice40 was a 2021 social equity and environmental justice initiative by the Biden administration in the United States. It sought to identify disadvantaged communities and prioritize federal investments to benefit these communities. The specific categories considered include health issues, legacy pollution hazards, climate change impacts, energy costs, transportation impacts, water/wastewater exposures, workforce/income challenges, and housing challenges. Agencies involved in implementing the initiative were the U.S. departments of Agriculture, Commerce, Energy, Health and Human Services, Housing and Urban Development, Interior, Labor, Transportation, Veterans Affairs; and the Army Corps of Engineers, Environmental Protection Agency and Federal Emergency Management Agency.

Justice40 efforts were ended by the Trump administration in 2025 under Executive Order 14148.

== See also ==
- Environmental policy of the Biden administration
