= Report of the Special Committee on the Termination of the National Emergency =

US Senate document by the 93rd Congress

The Report of the Special Committee on the Termination of the National Emergency, also known as Senate Report 93-549, was a document issued by the "Special Committee on the Termination of the National Emergency" of the 93rd Congress (hence the "93" in the name) (1973 to 1975). Its purpose was to discuss and address the 40-year-long national emergency that had been in effect in the United States since 1933. During the continued emergency, Congress voted to transfer powers from itself to the President. The debate to end long-running national emergencies ended in 1976 with the National Emergencies Act (50 U.S.C. 1601–1651), which rescinded the president's authority under the prior emergencies and established an expiration period (subject to annual presidential renewal) on future declared emergencies.

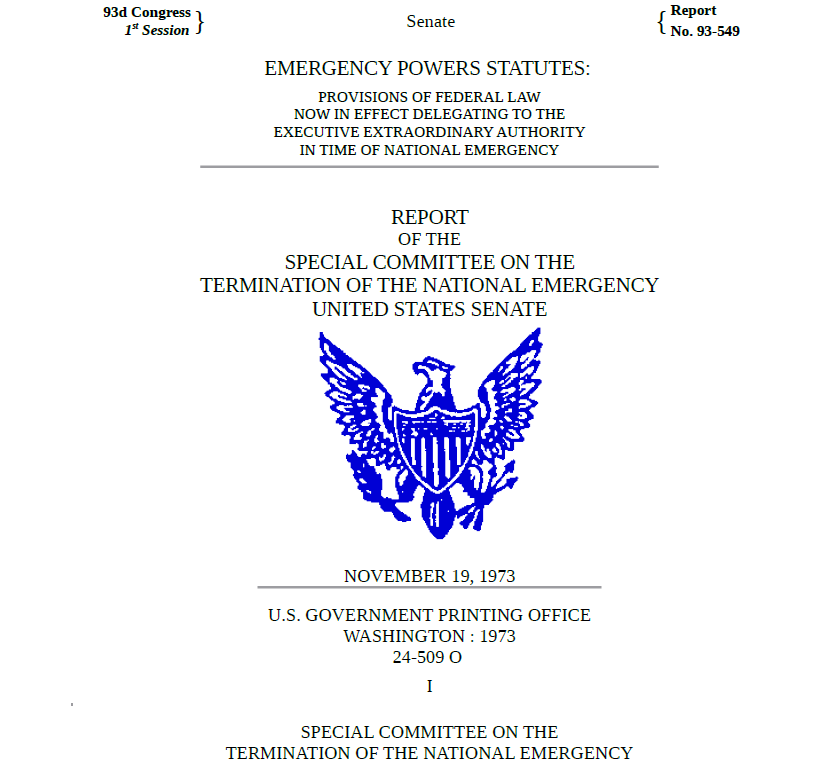
Cover page of the report

== Content ==
The bulk of the report is an inventory of approximately 470 sections in federal law that extend emergency powers to the President and the executive branch. Before this comes an introduction discussing the history of how such a political situation developed.

The committee noted that prior to Franklin Roosevelt, presidents had responded to emergencies through existing legal authority, or by seeking emergency legislation. Roosevelt took a more assertive approach, believing that the executive branch had a public duty to "do anything that the needs of the Nation demanded" except where the Constitution or laws prohibited it. In responding to the Great Depression and World War II, Roosevelt used declarations of emergency to signal his intent to broaden executive power, with the expectation that Congress (controlled by his own party) would ratify his actions. This pattern repeated under Harry Truman during the Korean War and became the backdrop of the Cold War. Reflecting on the situation, the committee observed:

"The 2,000-year-old problem of how a legislative body in a democratic republic may extend extraordinary powers for use by the executive during times of great crisis and dire emergency — but do so in ways assuring both that such necessary powers will be terminated immediately when the emergency has ended and that normal processes will be resumed — has not yet been resolved in this country. Too few are aware of the existence of emergency powers and their extent, and the problem has never been squarely faced."

The committee's investigation found that while some declared emergencies had been explicitly terminated, others had not. These were:

- Roosevelt's 1933 declaration under the Trading with the Enemy Act, which he used to block gold and silver transactions
- Truman's 1950 declaration in relation to the Korean War (then known as the Korean Conflict)
- Richard Nixon's 1970 declaration in response to a postal strike
- Nixon's further 1971 declaration in connection with floating the dollar

Aside from these particular examples, the committee noted a trend since Roosevelt of transferring broad authority to the President in times of crisis and leaving it in place. The practical effect was to enable the President, as much as Congress, to make laws. The committee found that these longstanding grants of authority were not merely theoretical, but that executive agencies actively used them to justify various programs such as the Federal Bureau of Investigation's domestic surveillance program. The report recommended that Congress should act to terminate the standing emergencies and to regulate the President's use of emergency authority.

== See also ==
- National Emergencies Act
- State of emergency
- List of national emergencies in the United States
