= Other than a Plan D situation =

Draft US legislation available in a crisis

Documents for contingencies (other than a plan D situation) which justify application of emergency measures on a national scale, often shortened to Other than a Plan D Situation, is the name of a file maintained by the United States government containing legal guidance and draft legislation for the President of the United States, or his designated successor, to advance to the United States Congress in the aftermath of a devastating national catastrophe. The file is curated and updated by the Federal Emergency Management Agency.

"Other than a Plan D situation" is predicated on the assumption that, in a severe crisis that paralyzes or impedes normal governmental operations, the president may not have the time or immediate access to legal counsel to properly advise the Congress on emergency legislation required for national survival. "Other than a Plan D situation" is an elaborate set of already-drafted model legislation which the president can immediately present to the Congress for enactment following the onset of the crisis.

Actual "Plan D" documents, by contrast, are those contained in Federal Emergency Plan D-Minus, and its successor plans, and are executive orders which can be promulgated by the president without consulting Congress, using existing constitutional and statutory authority.

Past "Other than a Plan D situation" documents have included a "fill in the blank" declaration of war, legislation permitting the United States secretary of the treasury to modify the size or design of U.S. coinage, and a bill which would waive interest penalties for the late-filing of U.S. income tax by persons residing in cities destroyed by nuclear attack.

== See also ==
- Presidential Emergency Action Documents
