= Trump administration farmer bailouts =

Series of aid to farmers during Donald Trump's presidencies

Trump administration farmer bailouts are a series of United States bailout programs introduced as part of the economic policy of Donald Trump to help US farmers suffering due to the China–United States trade war and trade disputes with the European Union, Japan, Canada, Mexico, and others.

The bailouts were authorized directly by the executive branch under the Commodity Credit Corporation act and were not subject to Congressional approval.

== Justification ==
Due to the China–United States trade war started by Donald Trump, China imposed tariffs on peanut butter, soybeans, orange juice, and other agriculture products that affected US farmers, especially in swing states, such as Iowa, Ohio, and Wisconsin. US farmers lost access to import markets in China, which represented the second largest market for US agriculture export in 2017. The export of soybeans, primarily used as animal feed, to China fell by 94% in 2017. It fell to zero by November 2018. Similar tariffs affected demand for U.S. pork and dairy products.

In 2019, public health officials reported increased suicides caused by unpredictable financial conditions among, especially young farmers. Bankruptcies and delinquent loan payments by farmers also increased drastically. The number of farm bankruptcies in the second quarter of 2025 was double the number of bankruptcies for the entire year of 2024.

== Bailouts ==
=== First presidency of Donald Trump ===
In July 2018, the United States Department of Agriculture distributed $12 billion in direct cash payments to producers of corn, cotton, soybeans, sorghum, wheat, dairy, and certain meat products. Soybean producers received $7.3 billion in payments, more payments than any other agricultural producers because of the impact on US soybean exports.

In 2019, Trump added $16 billion in bailout funds. This bailout had more requirements due to claims of abuse in the 2018 program.

US farmers who earned less than $900,000 a year and produced one of the agriculture products suffering from the China–United States trade war could apply for the program. The bailout's limit of support for a single farmer was $125,000 per person or legal entity. US citizens owning partial shares of a land but not profiting directly from farming could apply for government aid as well.

=== Second presidency of Donald Trump ===
In December 2025, the administration announced $12 billion "available in one time bridge payments to American farmers". Of the $12 billion, $11 billion was allocated to farmers of barley, chickpeas, corn, cotton, lentils, oats, peanuts, peas, rice, sorghum, soybeans, wheat, canola, crambe, flax, mustard, rapeseed, safflower, sesame, and sunflower.
