= War Powers Act of 1941 =

United States emergency law authorizing entry into WWII

- Long title: An Act to expedite the prosecution of the war effort.
- Nicknames: First War Powers Act, 1941
- Enacted by: the 77th United States Congress
- Effective: December 18, 1941

Citations
- Public law: Pub. L. 77–354
- Statutes at Large: 55 Stat. 838, Chap. 593

Codification
- Titles amended: 50 U.S.C.: War and National Defense
- U.S.C. sections created: 50a U.S.C. §§ 601-605

Legislative history
- Introduced in the House as H.R. 6233 by Hatton W. Sumners (D–TX) on December 15, 1941; Passed the House on December 16, 1941 (Passed); Passed the Senate on December 16, 1941 (Passed, in lieu of S. 2129) with amendment; House agreed to Senate amendment on December 17, 1941 (Passed); Signed into law by President Franklin D. Roosevelt on December 18, 1941

The War Powers Act of 1941, also known as the First War Powers Act, was an American emergency law that increased federal power during World War II. The act was signed into law by U.S. President Franklin D. Roosevelt on December 18, 1941, less than two weeks after the Japanese attack on Pearl Harbor. The act was similar to the Departmental Reorganization Act of 1917 as it was signed shortly before the U.S. engaged in a large war and increased the powers of the U.S. Executive Branch.

The act gave the president enormous authority to execute World War II in an efficient manner. The president was authorized to reorganize the executive branch, independent government agencies, and government corporations for the war cause. With the act, the president was allowed to censor mail and other forms of communication between the United States and foreign countries. The act and all changes created by its power were to remain intact until six months after the end of the war at which time, the act would become defunct.

Three months after passing the first, the Second War Powers Act was passed on March 27, 1942. This further strengthened the executive branch powers towards executing World War II. This act allowed the acquisition, under condemnation if necessary, of land for military or naval purposes. Some provisions of the Hatch Act of 1939 were also suspended which reduced naturalization standards for aliens within the U.S. Armed Forces. In addition, it created methods for war-related production contracting along with adjusting several other aspects of government affairs. The Second War Powers Act also repealed the confidentiality of census data, allowing the FBI to use this information to round up Japanese-Americans.

Under Secretary of War Robert P. Patterson retroactively delegated his authority from the president under the War Powers Act of 1941 to Leslie Groves for the Manhattan Project. The authority, given in a memorandum to Groves dated April 17, 1944, was retroactive to September 1, 1942. The written delegation was only given in 1944 when Grove's deputy Kenneth Nichols was about to sign a large contract with Du Pont, and it was found that he only had a low delegated authority, as Nichols' higher authority for the Manhattan Project had only been given verbally by General Wilhelm D. Styer to his predecessor Colonel James C. Marshall.

== See also ==
- Naval Act of 1938
- Office of Alien Property Custodian
- Office of War Mobilization
- Two-Ocean Navy Act
- United States Office of War Information
- War Powers Act (disambiguation)
- War Shipping Administration
- Executive Order 9066

== Notes ==
- First War Powers Act, 55 Stat. 838, House Bill 6233, December 18, 1941
- Second War Powers Act, 56 Stat. 176, Senate Bill 2208, March 27, 1942
