= Postal interception =

Retrieval of mail intended for someone else, for espionage purposes

Postal interception is the act of retrieving another person's mail for the purpose of either ensuring that the mail is not delivered to the recipient, or to spy on them.

For instance, the American Central Intelligence Agency (CIA) and Federal Bureau of Investigation (FBI) were involved in numerous large-scale operations targeting US activist groups, whose mail was opened and photographed. In one such programme, over 215,000 letters were opened. In the United Kingdom, the Special Investigations Unit of the General Post Office was responsible for postal interception.

Since 2002, the United States Postal Service photographs the outside of all mail, retains those images for weeks or months, and provides them to police or other investigators upon a simple request.

== See also ==
- Black room
- Church Committee
- COINTELPRO
- Interdiction
- Mail cover
- Mail Isolation Control and Tracking
- Postal censorship
- Surveillance
- Secrecy of correspondence
