= Military censorship =

Type of censorship

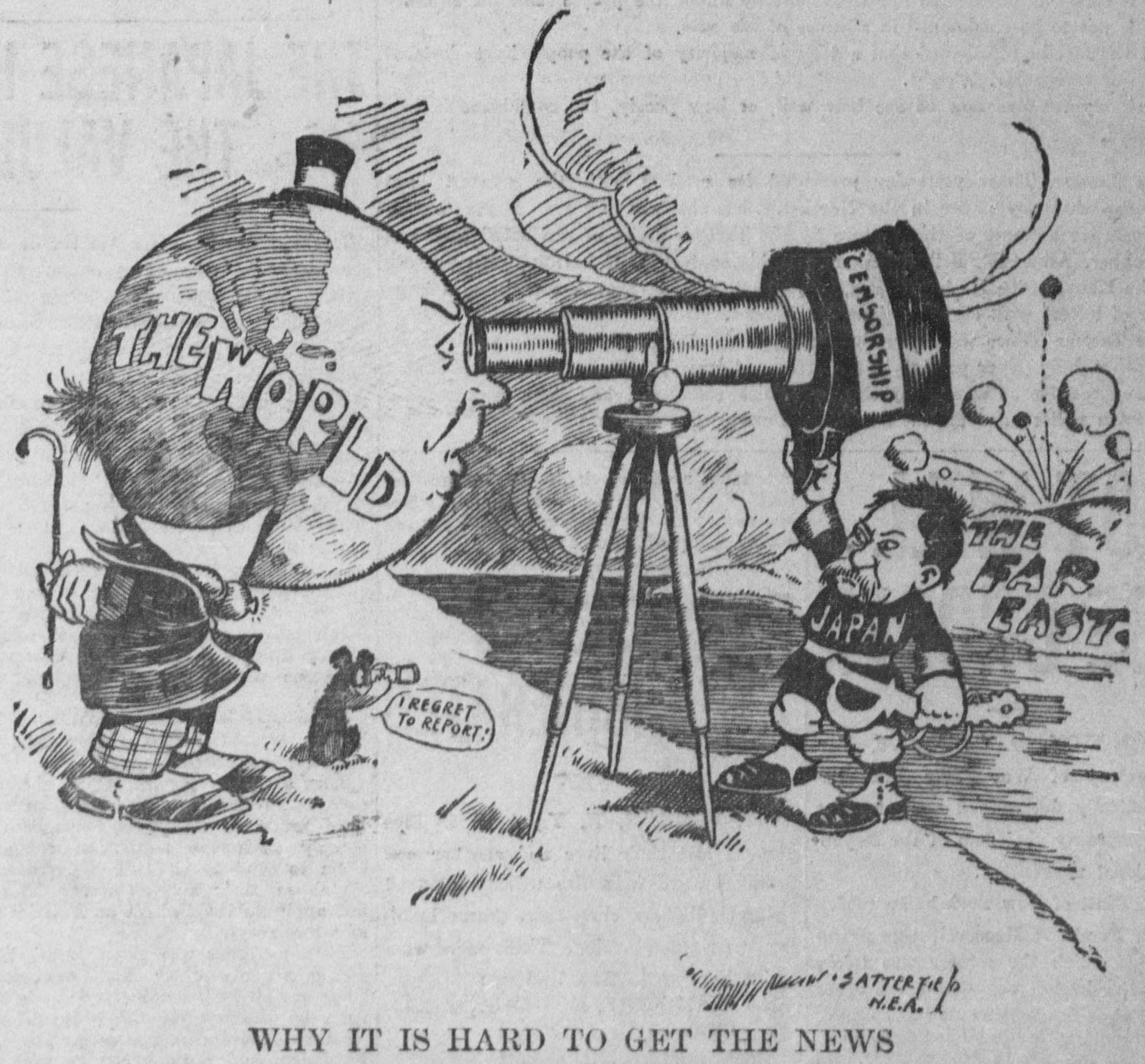
Satterfield cartoon about Japanese military censorship during the Russo-Japanese War

Military censorship is a type of censorship that is the process of keeping military intelligence and tactics confidential and away from the enemy. This is used to counter espionage. Military censorship intensifies during wartime.

== United States ==
Military censorship existed in the United States since the time of the American Civil War. United States military in the 20th century defined military censorship as "all types of censorship conducted by personnel of the Armed Forces of the United States", and distinguished within it armed forces censorship, civil censorship, prisoner of war censorship and field press censorship.

== Notable military censors ==
- Israeli Military Censor
- Office of Censorship
- Wartime Information Security Program

== See also ==
- Cartographic censorship
- Information warfare
- Postal censorship
- Prior restraint
- War correspondent
