= Continuity of government =

Principle of emergency government

Continuity of government (COG) is the principle of establishing defined procedures that allow a government to continue its essential operations in case of a catastrophic event such as nuclear war.

In the United States, the Continuity of Operations Plan was activated following the September 11 attacks.

== By country ==
=== Australia ===
During the years following the federation of Australia in 1901, several locations were considered for the national capital. One of the criteria used to assess sites was that they needed to be inland so that they could not be attacked from the sea. It was also believed that locations away from the coast would have a lower incidence of disease. During the Cold War the Office of National Assessments believed that it was unlikely that Australian cities would be attacked by the Soviet Union during a nuclear war.

The modern Australian Government has plans to enable the continuity of government. As of 2008, these formed part of 'Plan Mercator', which the government has described as aiming "to minimise the impact of a national security emergency on critical government operations and provide for the rapid resumption of 'near normal' government business under alternate arrangements until normal operations can be resumed".

Under the Australian system of government, there is not necessarily a requirement to maintain the Cabinet in a crisis. If the Prime Minister was killed in a disaster, the Governor-General would need to appoint their successor. A national unity government could also be formed in a major crisis.

A range of legislation, including the Defence Act 1903 and several health bills, include provisions that can be activated in response to emergencies. There are also plans for the Parliament of Australia to operate from another location if it is unable to sit at Parliament House in Canberra. These plans are classified.

The Canberra Times has reported that an Australian Government building in the Canberra suburb of Symonston houses communications systems that would be used to support the continuity of government if Plan Mercator was activated. The building was completed in 2007, and its secret function was disclosed as part of a job advertisement in 2008.

In response to the COVID-19 pandemic, the federal and most of the state and territory parliaments cancelled scheduled sittings from March 2020. Federal parliamentary committees continued to operate virtually. The federal parliament met with only the number of members necessary to form a quorum present on several occasions between March and June 2020, and resumed full sittings from August that year. The arrangements in place from August allowed members of parliament who were unable to travel to Canberra to participate virtually, but these members were unable to vote in proceedings.

Prime Minister Scott Morrison arranged to be secretly appointed to hold several ministerial positions during 2020 and 2021, justifying his appointment as the Minister for Finance and Minister for Health as being necessary in case the ministers for portfolios were affected by COVID-19 and unable to perform their duties. Morrison's appointment as Minister for Health was approved in March 2020 by the National Security Committee of Cabinet as part of measures taken in response to the pandemic, but was not publicly announced. His subsequent appointment to the other ministries was not known to other members of the government. An inquiry held into the matter during 2022 that was headed by Former High Court justice Virginia Bell found that Morrison had not needed to hold these ministries, as he could have been appointed "in a matter of minutes" if the ministers had been incapacitated. Morrison did not use the powers available to him as Finance or Health minister.

=== Canada ===
Canada built numerous nuclear bunkers across the country, nicknamed "Diefenbunkers" in a play on the last name of then-Prime Minister John Diefenbaker. In 2016, the Privy Council Office made an agreement with the Department of National Defence to open two bunkers for government officials amid the ongoing North Korean nuclear crisis.

=== China ===
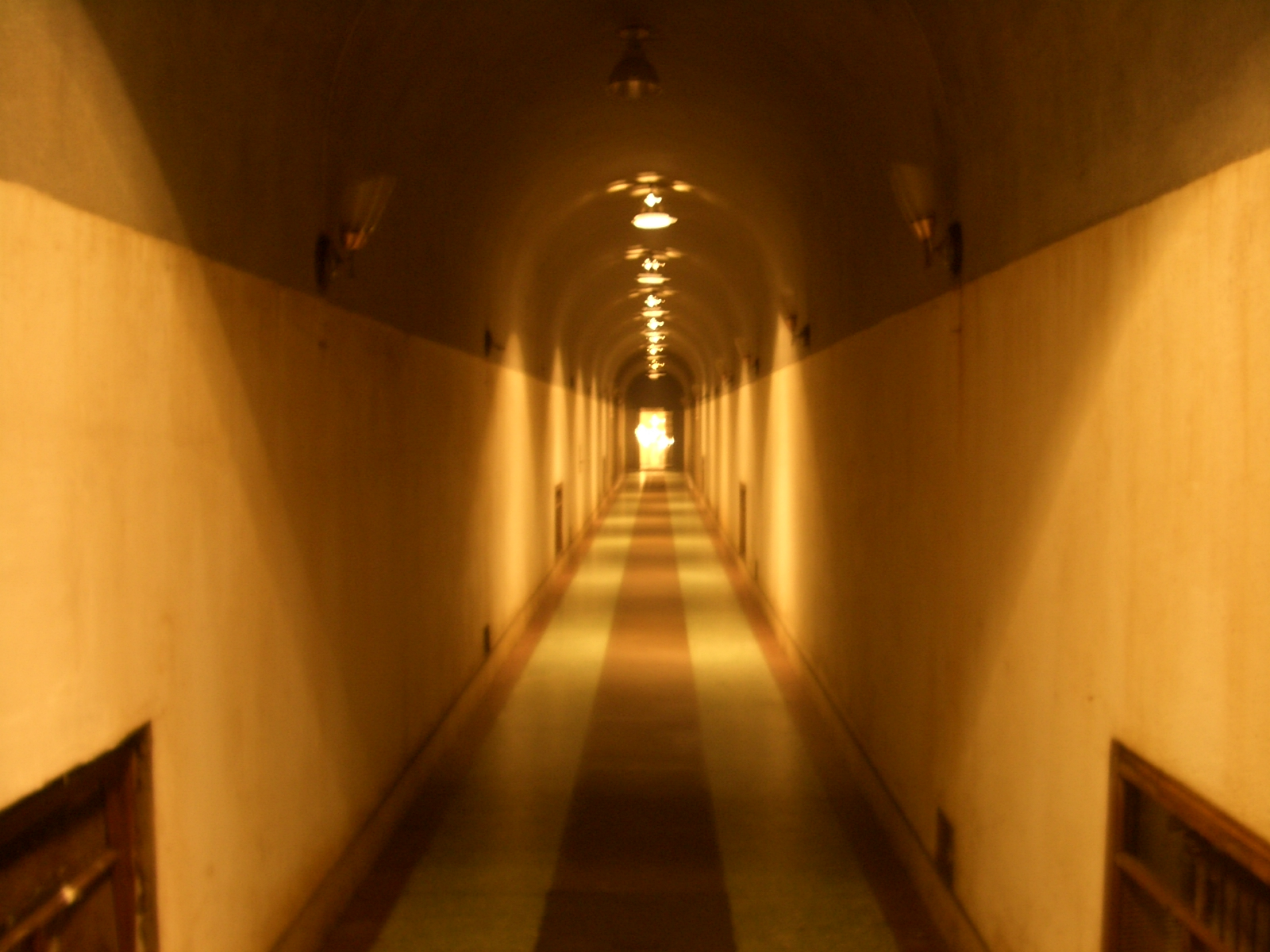
In a tunnel of Project 131

The People's Republic of China (PRC) once operated Underground Project 131, intended to be the PLA headquarters in Hubei during a nuclear conflict. Built due to the Sino-Soviet split during that portion of the Cold War, in 1981, the Project 131 site was turned over to the civilian authorities of the prefecture-level city of Xianning, where it is located.

=== Czech Republic ===
The K-116 facility under Zlíchov hill in western Prague was designated to house the Czechoslovak government in case of nuclear attack (together with the K-9 facility in Jihlava) and might still be used as the emergency headquarters of the Czech government and military.

=== Denmark ===
During the Cold War, Denmark built two bunker complexes, named REGAN Vest and REGAN Øst (Danish: "REGeringsANlæg", translated: "Government Complex West and Government Complex East"), in Jutland and Zealand respectively. The idea was to have half of the government and the royal family in one bunker, and the other half in the other, allowing continuity of government, even if one of the bunkers were destroyed or cut off.

=== France ===
The Centre d'opération des forces aériennes stratégiques (COFAS) is a hardened command centre for French nuclear forces at Taverny Air Base in Taverny, Val d'Oise. The alternate national command center is located at Mont Verdun near Lyon.

The hardened headquarters of Force océanique stratégique (FOST), France's nuclear SSBN fleet, is at Brest, Finistère.

=== Germany ===
Germany operated a government bunker (Regierungsbunker) to house the German government, parliament and all federal personnel needed to keep the government working in the event of war or severe crisis. It was decommissioned in 1997.

=== Ireland ===
In Ireland, the National Security Committee (NSC) is the conduit for officials to communicate with the Taoiseach (Prime Minister) and/or cabinet members if the normal channel of communication with their minister became unavailable. Drafts of emergency powers legislation have been drawn up in secret, including legislation to deal with circumstances such as an attack on cabinet involving numerous deaths.

During the period of the Cold War, it was envisaged that cabinet ministers, senior civil servants and military advisers would use an underground nuclear bunker at Custume Barracks in Athlone in the event of a nuclear exchange. The bunker was equipped with a command and control centre with communications equipment – which had a hotline to the British government in Whitehall – a map room pointing out important areas for protection, kitchen, bedroom and bathroom facilities.

=== Israel ===
As of December 2003 an underground national crisis management center was being constructed at an undisclosed location in the Judaean Mountains under Jerusalem. Another command and control bunker is being built as part of the new Prime Minister's Office complex in Givat Ram.

=== Poland ===
According to Constitution of Poland in case of death or inability to discharging duties of the President, his duties are discharged by Marshal of the Sejm (or if they are unable, the Marshal of the Senate).

After Smolensk air disaster in 2010 a lot of the highest state and army offices were emptied. Their duties were automatically taken over by respective deputies.

=== New Zealand ===
The New Zealand government believes the most likely disaster scenario to affect the government is a large earthquake in Wellington. The government has plans to move Parliament and essential staff to Devonport Naval Base in Auckland if such an event occurs. The New Zealand Parliament only requires a speaker, a minister and a clerk to be present for quorum requirements to be met. If ministers were killed in a disaster, the survivors can continue as the government and other members of parliament can be appointed as ministers.

The website of the Governor-General of New Zealand notes that their constitutional role is to "maintain the legitimacy and continuity of government by ensuring there is always a government in office with a democratic mandate to govern". If the Governor-General was killed they would be automatically be replaced by the most senior judge from New Zealand's upper courts.

The New Zealand National Crisis Management Centre is located under the "Beehive" building in Wellington. An Alternate National Crisis Management Centre is in Auckland, and would be activated if the facility in Wellington was damaged, if multiple crises were occurring or if the government is required to relocate to Auckland. A 2024 government review found that both facilities were not fit for purpose, but the deputy chief executive of the National Emergency Management Agency noted that the National Crisis Management Centre could operate from tents if needed.

=== Norway ===
The Norwegian government operates a nuclear bunker called Sentralanlegget in Buskerud County. The bunker is meant to accommodate the Norwegian royal family and the government in case of a nuclear/military attack on the nation, and also function as a wartime headquarters. There is also a bunker beneath Høyblokka in downtown Oslo.

=== Soviet Union and Russia ===
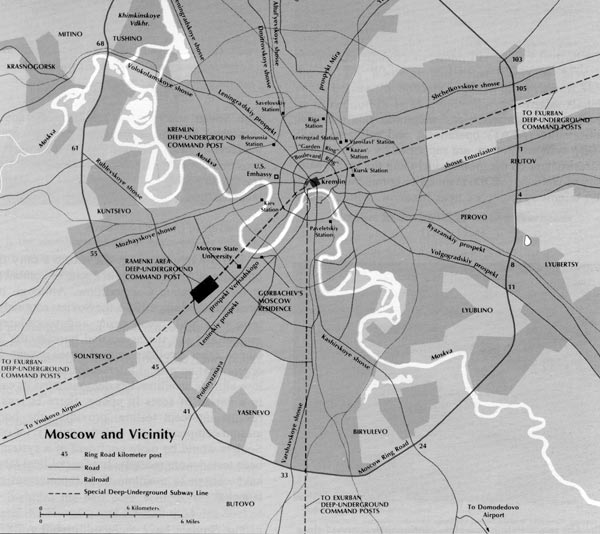
Map of the Metro-2 system as supposed by the United States military intelligence in 1991.

In the public domain very little is known about Russia's COG plans. One sprawling underground facility residing in tunnels cut into Mount Yamantau is likely to be related to the survival of Russia's government, given its size and decades long construction history, with a construction start during the rule of Leonid Brezhnev (1964–82). KGB defector Colonel Oleg Gordievsky states that an organization, known as Directorate 15, was (or is) tasked with building and maintaining a network of hundreds of underground command bunkers for the Soviet leadership; this includes the vast site beneath Yamantau Mountain, which is often called Mezhgorye / Межго́рье after the closed city that is located nearby. However, there is speculation, due to its proximity to Chelyabinsk-70, that Yamantau is a 400-square-mile underground complex which houses nuclear warheads, missiles, launch controls, and several nuclear weapons factories designed to continue production after a hypothetical nuclear war begins.

The second command and control center in the Urals, after Yamantau, is similarly speculated to be underground and located near, or under, Kosvinsky Kamen. The site is believed to host the Russian Strategic Rocket Forces alternate command post, a post for the general staff built to compensate for the vulnerability of older Soviet era command posts in the Moscow region. In spite of this, the primary command posts for the Strategic Rocket Forces remains Kuntsevo in Moscow and the secondary is the Kosvinsky Mountain in the Urals. The facility at Kosvinsky, finished in early 1996, was designed to resist US earth-penetrating warheads and serves a similar role as the American Cheyenne Mountain Complex.

Further command centers, according to globalsecurity.org, include one near Chekhov, which is the Russian General Staff wartime command post, buried deep underground, and Sharapovo(ru) about 80 kilometres (50 mi) south of Moscow, built in the 1950s, Sharapovo is believed to have been the primary backup command center for the Soviet era leadership. Both Chekhov and Sharapovo are each suggested to have the capability to accommodate about 30,000 individuals, As an alternative to Sharapovo, a secondary political leadership base is located at Chaadayevka, some 650 kilometers southeast of Moscow near the city of Penza.

There is also said to be as many as 12 underground levels beneath the Russian capital of Moscow to protect the government in the Kremlin, known as the Main Directorate of special programs of the President (Glavnoye Upravlenie Specialnih Program: GUSP) (ru) the direct successor of the 15th Directorate of the KGB, which was established in 1977, GUSP is said to oversee, amongst other sites, a parallel track line alongside the Moscow metro, known as the 'Kremlin line' Metro-2 or D-6 to be used in an emergency. Two destinations of this system are suggested to be the old KGB headquarters, now the FSB headquarters, at Lubyanka Square, and the second being regarded as an enormous underground leadership bunker adjacent to Moscow State University. Another alleged subterranean destination, apart from the aforementioned underground town at Ramenki/Moscow State University is Vnukovo-2 airport. Despite official Russian state ambiguity, it is speculated that many of the Moscow bunkers are linked by an underground railway line.

=== Sweden ===
In case of war, the Riksdag can convene somewhere else than in the capital, and if necessary, a War Delegation will replace the Riksdag. The War Delegation consists of the Speaker and 50 members of the Riksdag. The government can put a number of enabling acts in force to regulate for example rationing, export and seizing of property. If the government is unable to carry out its duties the Riksdag may decide on the formation of a new government. Likewise, if the Riksdag and the War Delegation are unable to carry out its duties, the government can assume the powers of the Riksdag, but with some limitations.

During the Cold War, the Klara skyddsrum ("Klara shelter" or "Klara bunker") was built underneath Stockholm. The bunker is designed to accommodate two thirds of the government and between 8,000 and 12,000 civilians in the case of a military attack on Stockholm. It is designed as a very large, two-story oval, with multiple entrances. During peacetime, parts of it are used as a parking garage. Sweden built over 65,000 fallout shelters in regular houses, and every county had at least one large hard-rock underground bunker that controlled a number of smaller bunkers that were located in the municipalities.

=== Turkey ===
There is little public knowledge about continuity of government in Turkey. The cabinet and presidential offices, based in the capital of Ankara, have secondary sites in Istanbul and İzmir.

=== United Kingdom ===
The primary British COG headquarters is at the Ministry of Defence in Whitehall. The Central Government War Headquarters was previously maintained in a quarry complex near Corsham, Wiltshire. The above-ground support facility was RAF Rudloe Manor.

Service command centres are Northwood for the Royal Navy Trident SSBN force, and RAF High Wycombe for the Royal Air Force.

=== United States ===
Continuity of the national government was first threatened in late 1776, when British forces advanced toward the Continental capital at Philadelphia. On December 9, the Continental Congress passed a resolution in anticipation of a British capture:

Resolved: That in case this Congress shall be under the necessity of removing from Philadelphia, it shall be adjourned to Baltimore.

The Congress was adjourned as planned three days later. Other relocations followed during the course of the Revolutionary War.

For most of its existence, the United States operated without a standing continuity plan. When British forces burned Washington in 1814, Secretary of State James Monroe received only a few hours' notice to remove the government records. Although his staff saved many valuable records, much was nonetheless destroyed, and the next administration encountered a great deal of confusion.

In 1952, President Truman ordered all federal offices to develop their own continuity plans for the event of a civil defense emergency. Plans have been maintained and adapted since then, at times requiring the construction of secret facilities such as the emergency Congress facility in Greenbrier County, West Virginia. The current continuity policy is defined in National Security Policy Directive 51 and its implementation plan. The continuity plan was activated for the first time during the September 11, 2001 attacks and then again during the January 6 United States Capitol attack. Presidential Emergency Action Documents (PEADs) are draft classified executive orders, proclamations, and messages to Congress that are prepared for the President of the United States to exercise or expand powers in anticipation of a range of emergency hypothetical worst-case scenarios, so that they are ready to sign and put into effect the moment one of those scenarios comes to pass.

The United States presidential line of succession is the order in which officials of the United States federal government assume the powers and duties of the office of president of the United States if the incumbent president becomes incapacitated, dies, resigns, or is removed from office. It was adopted in 1947, and last revised in 2006. The designated survivor is an individual in the line of succession, chosen to stay away from events such as State of the Union addresses and presidential inaugurations.

Congress has various steps to continue operations at a new location if needed, and to speed up replacement of members after death. Senators can be replaced by appointment in most states, while special elections replace members of the House of Representatives.

State legislatures have rules to change the quorum needed in emergencies. The federal government has advice for other aspects of continuity of state, local, tribal and territorial governments. Advice for elections suggests a format, but not how to operate, such as hand counts or backup computers. Voters have adopted some ballot measures for continuity of state government.

Government plans cover what officials can do, not what citizens need to do in the hours and days before government recovers. "Regular people are the most important people at a disaster scene... experts will err on the side of excluding the public, as we have seen. If they can avoid enrolling regular people in their emergency plans, they will. Life is easier that way, until something goes wrong."

== See also ==
- Critical infrastructure protection
- Data embassy, a set of servers that store one country's data in another country to ensure a country's digital continuity with particular respect to critical databases
- Decapitation strike
- Disaster recovery
- Government in exile
- Shadow government (disambiguation)
- Temporary capital

UK-specific:

- Central Government War Headquarters
- Civil Contingencies Secretariat

US-specific:

- Continuity of Government Commission
- Continuity of Operations Plan
- Designated survivor
- National Security and Homeland Security Presidential Directive
- Presidential Emergency Facility
- Wartime Information Security Program
- Senate Report 93-549
- Federal Emergency Management Agency
