= Office of Censorship =

American agency during World War II

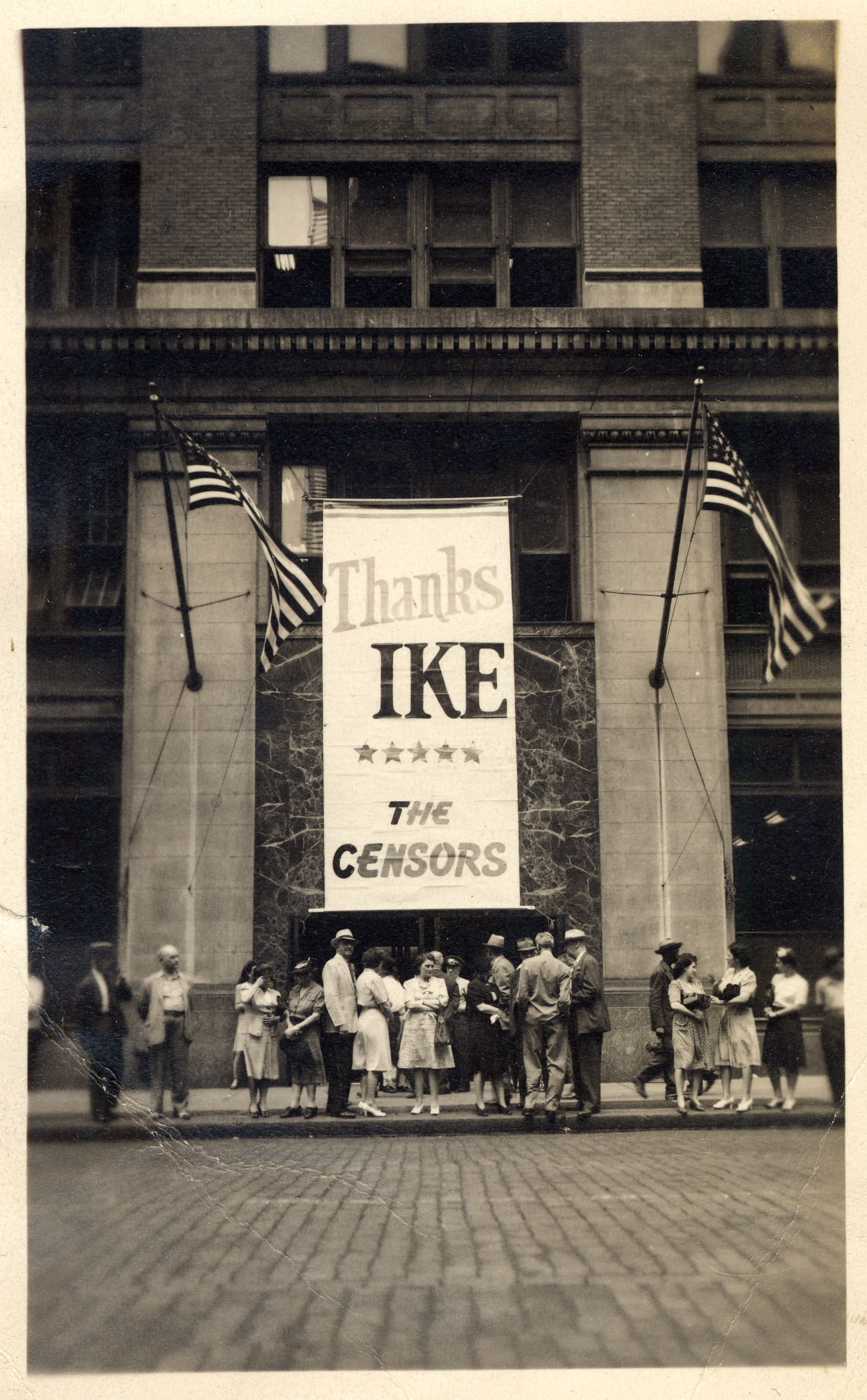
Manhattan Federal Building with Office of Censorship at 252 7th Avenue in 1945

The Office of Censorship was an emergency wartime agency set up by the United States federal government on December 19, 1941, to aid in the censorship of all communications coming into and going out of the United States, including its territories and the Philippines. The efforts of the Office of Censorship to balance the protection of sensitive war related information with the constitutional freedoms of the press is considered largely successful.

The agency's implementation of censorship was done primarily through a voluntary regulatory code that was willingly adopted by the press. The phrase "loose lips sink ships" was popularized during World War II, which is a testament to the urgency Americans felt to protect information relating to the war effort. Radio broadcasts, newspapers, and newsreels were the primary ways Americans received their information about World War II and therefore were the medium most affected by the Office of Censorship code. The closure of the Office of Censorship in November 1945 corresponded with the ending of World War II.

== History ==
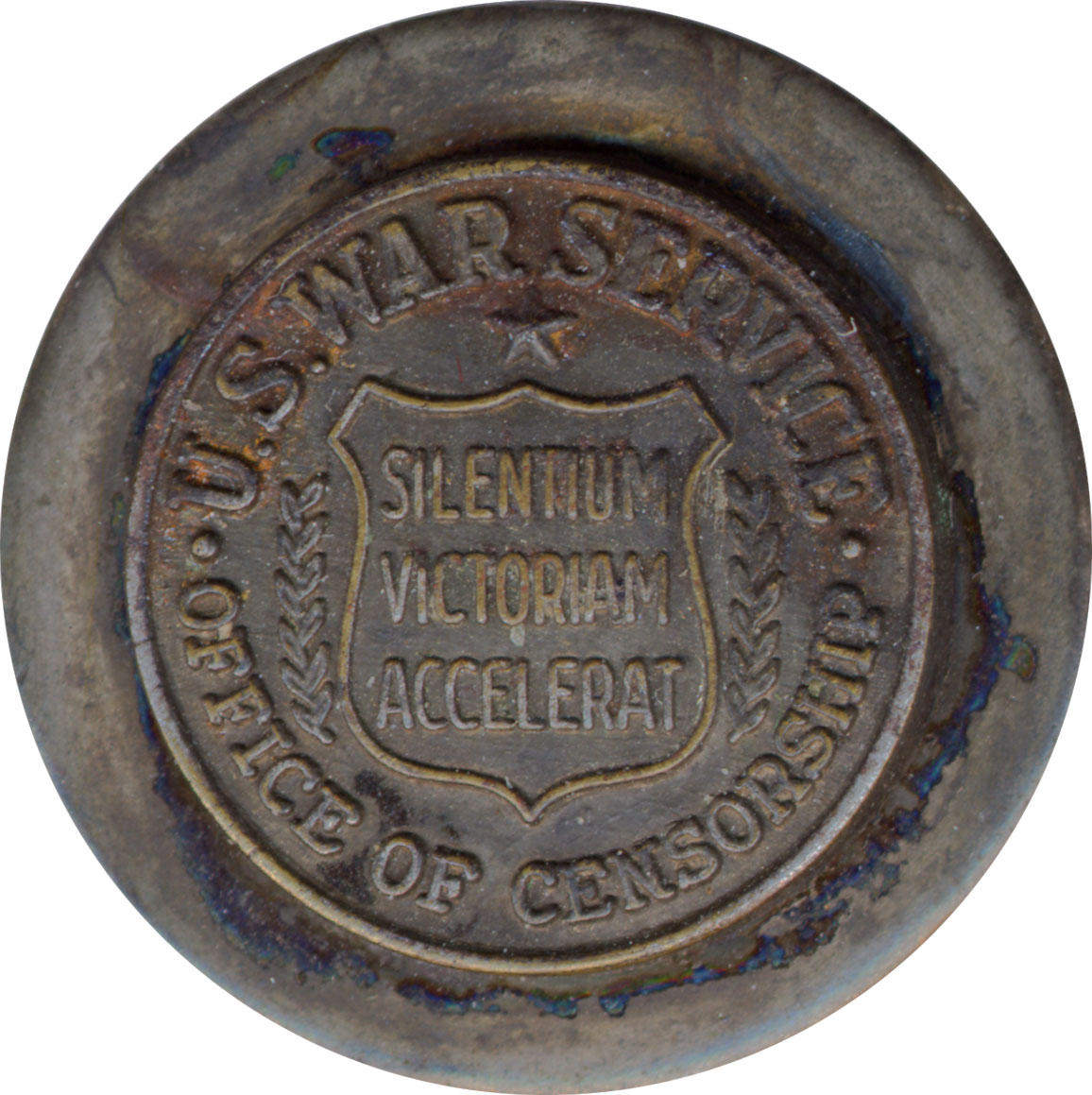
Employee pin of World War II US War Service, Office of Censorship. The words on the shield in the center read Silentium Victoriam Accelerat (Latin: "Silence Speeds Victory," the motto of the Office)

=== Immediate predecessors ===
Censorship by the American press began on a voluntary basis before America's official entry into World War II. In 1939, after the war had already begun in Europe, journalists in America started withholding information about Canadian troop movements. In September 1939, President Roosevelt declared a state of national emergency. In response to the threat of war, branches in the United States government that explicitly regulated censorship popped up within the Military and Navy. These branches were the Office of the Chief of Naval Operations, which began in September 1939, and the Censorship Branch in the Military Intelligence Division, which formed in June 1941. A Joint Board was also established in September 1939 to facilitate censorship planning between the Military and Navy departments of the US government.

The bombing of Pearl Harbor on December 7, 1941, caused the official entry of America into World War II and the reorganizing of government activities responsible for censoring communication in and out of the United States. The First War Powers Act, passed on December 18, 1941, contained broad grants of Executive authority, including a provision on censorship.

=== Executive Order 8985 ===
On December 19, 1941, President Franklin D. Roosevelt signed Executive Order 8985, which established the Office of Censorship and conferred on its director the power to censor international communications in "his absolute discretion." The order set up a Censorship Policy Board to advise the director on policy coordination and integration of censorship activities. It also authorized the director to establish a Censorship Operating Board that would bring together other government agencies to deal with issues of communication interception. By March 15, 1942, all military personnel who had been working on the Joint Board or on operations at the direction of the Joint Board were moved into the Office of Censorship.

=== The Director of Censorship ===
Byron Price, who was the executive news editor at the Associated Press, accepted the position of Director of Censorship on 19 December 1941 under the conditions that he would report directly to Roosevelt and that the president agreed with his desire to continue voluntary censorship. Throughout Price's tenure, the responsibility for censorship in the media was entirely on journalists. His motto for convincing the media to comply was, "Least said, soonest mended." Although over 30 agencies in the US government at the time of World War II had some censorship role, the foundation of government policies relied heavily on the patriotism and voluntary cooperation of news establishments. The American Civil Liberties Union said that Price had "censored the press and made them like it."

Price advocated against decentralizing the Office of Censorship and prevented it from merging with the Office of War Information. Price believed that a merger with the Office of War Information (OWI) would prevent the public from receiving truthful information with regards to war time efforts. While OWI and the Office of Censorship, both primarily dealt with censoring information related to the war, the OWI was also involved in political propaganda campaigns.

Though the official closure of the Office of Censorship did not come until November 1945, one day following Japanese surrender on August 14, 1945, Price hung a sign outside of his office door that read "out of business". In January 1946, then-President Harry Truman praised Price's work at the agency and awarded Price the Medal for Merit, which was at the time the highest decoration that could be awarded to an American civilian.

=== Activities ===
To effect closer coordination of censorship activities during the war effort, representatives of Great Britain, Canada, and the United States signed an agreement providing for the complete exchange of information among all concerned parties. They also created a central clearinghouse of information within the headquarters of the Office of Censorship.

Price utilized existing facilities of the War Department and Navy Department wherever possible. On March 15, 1942, Army and Navy personnel engaged in censorship activities moved from the War Department and Navy Department to the Office of Censorship. There they monitored the 350,000 overseas cables and telegrams and 25,000 international telephone calls each week. Offices in Los Angeles, New York City, and Rochester, New York, reviewed films.

Radio was especially vulnerable to government control under the Communications Act of 1934. The voluntary nature of censorship relieved many broadcasters, which had expected that war would cause the government to seize all stations and draft their employees into the army. Such authority existed; Attorney General Francis Biddle issued an opinion to Price in early 1942 that gave him almost unlimited authority over broadcasting. As an experienced journalist who disliked having to act as censor, he feared that a nationwide takeover of radio would result in a permanent government monopoly. Price believed that voluntary cooperation must be tried first with mandatory censorship only if necessary, and persuaded other government officials and the military to agree.

=== End of the agency ===
As the military situation improved, plans for adjustment and eventual cessation of censorship were devised. Executive Order 9631 issued the formal cessation of the Office of Censorship on September 28, 1945. The order became effective on November 15, 1945. Price thanked journalists nationwide for their cooperation: "You deserve, and you have, the thanks and appreciation of your Government. And my own gratitude and that of my colleagues in the unpleasant task of administering censorship is beyond words or limit." In a postwar memo to President Harry Truman on future wartime censorship procedures, Price wrote that "no one who does not dislike censorship should ever be permitted to exercise censorship" and urged that voluntary cooperation be again used.

== The Code of Wartime Practices for the American Press ==
The Code of Wartime Practices for the American Press was first issued on January 15, 1942, by the Office of Censorship. It had subsequent versions released on June 15, 1942, and on May 15, 1945, post-victory in Europe. The code set forth in simple terms—only seven pages for broadcasters, and five for the printed press—subjects that contained information of value to the enemy and which, therefore, should not be published or broadcast in the United States without authorization by a qualified government source. Price promised that "what does not concern the war does not concern censorship." Rather than having government officials review all articles and columns, the newspapers and radio stations voluntarily adopted to seek approval from a relevant government agency before discussing information on sensitive subjects. These sensitive subjects included factory production figures, troop movements, damages to American forces, and weather reports. All major news organizations in addition to 1,600 accredited wartime correspondents pledged to adhere to the code. A 24-hour hotline quickly answered media questions on appropriate topics.

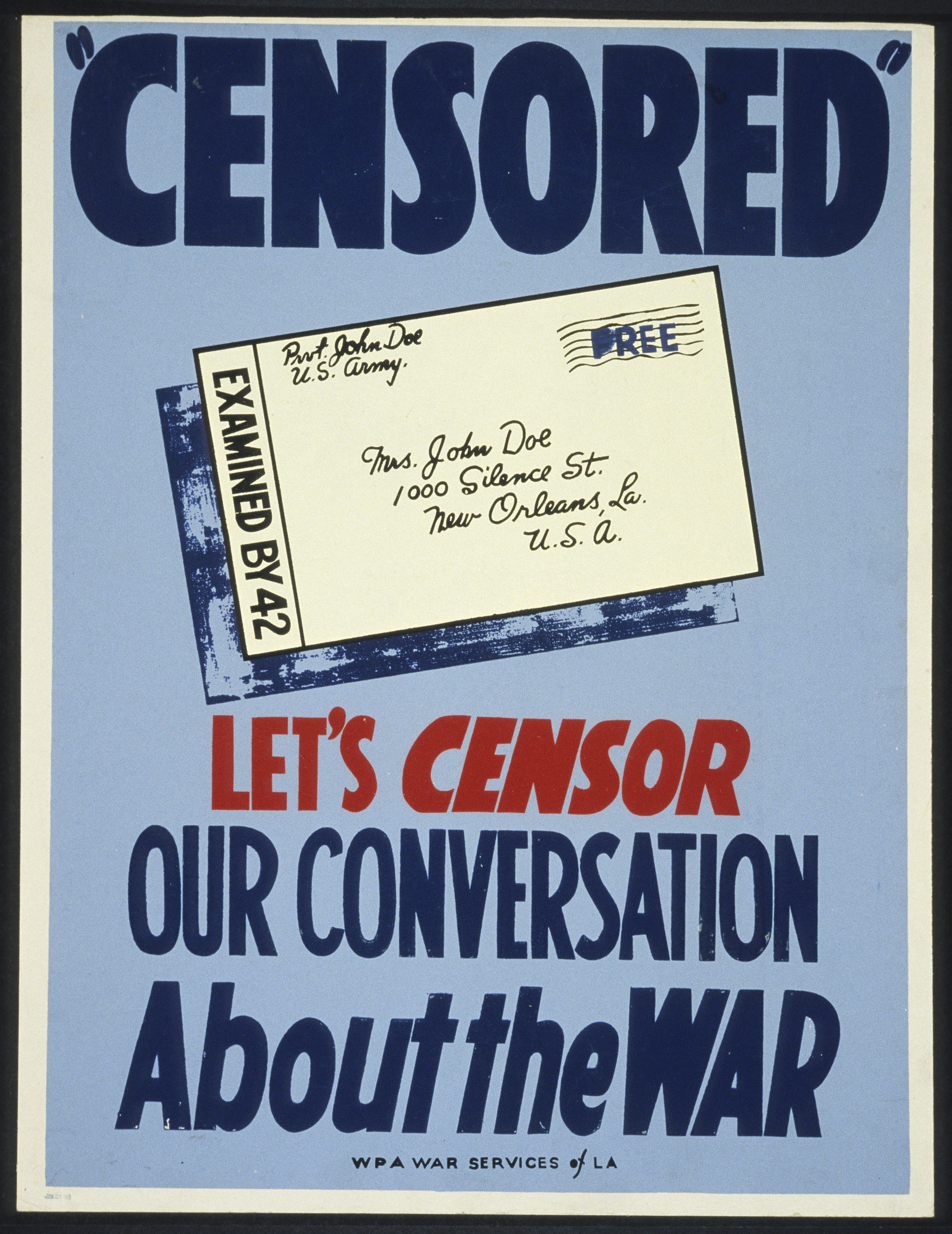
A 1943 Works Progress Administration poster suggesting that careless communication may be harmful to the war effort. It depicts a letter from a soldier stamped "examined by 42."

=== "Man in the street" ===
There was no government mandate to publish or broadcast positive news, unlike the Committee on Public Information during World War I. Complying with the code ended popular media features, however. Radio stations had to discontinue programs with audience participation and man on the street interviews because of the risk that an enemy agent might use the microphone. Similarly, lost-and-found advertisements ended and All Request programs were asked to avoid complying with specific times for music requests, in both cases to prevent encoded transmission of secret data. Stations cooperated despite losing the advertising revenue from sponsors; Price later estimated that losing man on the street programs alone cost stations "tens of millions of dollars" during the war, although the increase in war-related advertisements more than compensated.

=== Weather ===
The Office of Censorship and the Weather Bureau saw weather as especially sensitive. Military authorities asked the Office of Censorship to severely limit information about the weather because they feared too much information would help the enemy attack. Weather-related news comprised about half of all code violations. While newspapers could print temperature tables and regular bureau forecasts, the code asked radio stations to use only specially approved bureau forecasts to prevent enemy submarines from learning of current conditions. From January 15, 1942 to October 12, 1943 broadcasters said nothing about rain, snow, fog, wind, air pressure, temperature, or sunshine unless it was approved by the Weather Bureau. After Memphis, Tennessee stations could not discuss tornadoes that killed hundreds in March 1942, the code was changed to permit emergency bulletins but only if approved by the office. The office saw current weather conditions as so sensitive that it considered banning broadcasting any outdoor sports event, but decided that sport's benefit to morale was too important. When fog so covered a Chicago football game in August 1942 that the radio play-by-play announcer could not see the field, the Weather Bureau thanked him for never using the word "fog" or mentioning the weather. In 1942, First Lady Eleanor Roosevelt wrote a newspaper column about her travel across the country, in which she described the weather. She received "a very stern letter" from the Office of Censorship reprimanding her.

=== Presidential travel ===
The code specifically restricted information on "movements of the President of the United States". As Price reported only to the President, Roosevelt effectively became censor of all news about himself. When he toured war factories around the country for two weeks in September 1942, for example, only three wire service reporters accompanied him on the private railroad car Ferdinand Magellan. They filed articles for later publication, and despite being seen by tens of thousands of Americans, almost no mention appeared in the press of the president's trip until after it ended. Similar procedures were used on later domestic and international trips, such as to Casablanca in 1943 and Yalta in 1945. While the majority of reporters supported voluntarily censoring themselves over such travel, Roosevelt also used the code to hide frequent weekend trips to Springwood Estate and, some believed, the meetings with former lover Lucy Rutherford that began again in 1944. During the 1944 presidential election, he may have used his ability to avoid press reports to hide evidence of worsening health. Such arbitrary use of the code was controversial among Washington reporters, and Price privately wrote that Roosevelt "greatly abused" the press's cooperation.

=== Restrictions ===
Price stated throughout the war that he wanted censorship to end as soon as possible. The code of conduct was relaxed in October 1943 to permit weather information except barometric pressure and wind direction, and weather programs returned to radio. Most restrictions ended after V-E Day in May 1945, with the code only four pages in length after its final revision.

== Censorship failures ==
Two censorship failures of World War II:

- On June 7, 1942 the Chicago Tribune announcement of breaking of Japanese Purple (cipher machine).
- In June, 1943 Congressman Andrew Jackson May disclosed that Japanese depth charges were set too shallow-and resulted in the estimated losses of 10 US Submarines and 800 servicemen.
  - List of US Submarines lost by depth charges: 19 out of 53 lost; 1522 crew lost
  - USS Barbel (SS-316) 4 February 1945
  - USS Bonefish (SS-223) 18 June 1945
  - USS Bullhead (SS-332) 6 August 1945
  - USS Cisco (SS-290) 28 September 1943
  - USS Golet (SS-361) 14 June 1944
  - USS Grayback (SS-208) 27 February 1944
  - USS Grayling (SS-209) 9 September 1943
  - USS Growler (SS-215) 8 November 1944
  - USS Gudgeon (SS-211) 18 April 1944
  - USS Harder (SS-257) 24 August 1944
  - USS Lagarto (SS-371) 4 May 1945
  - USS S-44 (SS-155) 7 October 1943
  - USS Scamp (SS-277) 11 November 1944
  - USS Sculpin (SS-191) 19 November 1943
  - USS Shark (SS-314) 24 October 1944
  - USS Swordfish (SS-193) 12 January 1945
  - USS Trigger (SS-237) 28 March 1945
  - USS Trout (SS-202) 29 February 1944
  - USS Wahoo (SS-238) 11 October 1943

== Censorship of the atomic bomb ==
Price called the Manhattan Project, the United States' development of the atomic bomb, the best-kept secret of the war. It and radar were the two military topics that, if a code violation occurred, the office did not allow this to be used as a precedent for permitting other media outlets to report the same information. The government made a general announcement on radar in April 1943, and government and military officials frequently leaked information on the subject, but restrictions did not end until the day after Japan's surrender in August 1945.

The Manhattan Project was so secret that the Office of Censorship was not told about it until March 1943. Until the bombing of Hiroshima in August 1945, it helped keep the project secret by asking the press and broadcasters to voluntarily censor information they learned about atomic energy or the project. Journalists were asked not to report on various phrases, including "atom smashing", "atomic energy", "secret military weapons", and the elements "polonium, uranium, ytterbium, hafnium, protactinium, radium, rhenium, thorium, deuterium"; only uranium was sensitive, but was listed with other elements to hide its importance.

Perhaps the worst press violation occurred in August 1944, when due to procedural errors a nationwide Mutual Network broadcast mentioned the military creating a weapon in Pasco, Washington involving atom splitting. The Office of Censorship asked all recordings of the broadcast to be destroyed. As with radar, officials sometimes disclosed information to the press without authorization. That was not the first request for voluntary censorship of atomic-related information. Price noted in comments to reporters after the end of censorship that some 20,000 news outlets had been delivered similar requests. For the most part censors were able to keep sensitive information about the Manhattan Project from being published or broadcast. Slips of the tongue occurred with individuals knowledgeable about the project.

Another serious breach of secrecy occurred in March 1944, when John Raper of the Cleveland Press published "Forbidden City". The reporter, who had heard rumors while vacationing in New Mexico, described a secret project in Los Alamos, calling it "Uncle Sam's mystery town directed by '2nd Einstein'", J. Robert Oppenheimer. It speculated that the project was working on chemical warfare, powerful new explosives, or a beam that would cause German aircraft engines to fail. Manhattan Project leaders called the article "a complete lack of responsibility, compliance with national censorship code and cooperation with the Government in keeping an important project secret", and considered drafting Raper into the military, but the article apparently did not cause Axis spies to investigate the project.

After the Office of Censorship's Jack Lockhart turned down the role of becoming the Manhattan Project's press officer, the role was given to The New York Times' first science reporter, William L. Laurence, in the spring of 1945; he had interviewed Oppenheimer before the war. After Hiroshima the Times was thus the first to report on the specifics of the Manhattan Project on August 7, 1945. It wrote that the bomb was built in "three 'hidden cities' with a total population of 100,000 inhabitants", Los Alamos, Oak Ridge, Tennessee, and Hanford, Washington; as press officer, Laurence had visited each major facility. "None of the people, who came to these developments from homes all the way from Maine to California, had the slightest idea of what they were making in the gigantic Government plants they saw around them", the Times said.

== See also ==
- Postal censorship
- Censorship in the United States
- Wartime Information Security Program
- Military history of the United States during World War II
- United States home front during World War II
