= Black room =

Part of a communications center used by state officials for surveillance

A black room is part of a communication center (e.g. a post office) used by state officials to conduct clandestine interception and surveillance of communications. Typically, all letters or communications pass through the black room before being passed to the recipient. This practice had been in vogue since the establishment of postal and telegraph services, and was frequently used in France by the ministers of Louis XVIII and his followers as the cabinet noir (French for "black room").

In modern American network operations centers, optical splitters divert a percentage of the laser light from all incoming and outgoing fiber-optic cables to the secret room. An example is Room 641A in the SBC Communications building in San Francisco.

The term black room or black chamber has also been used to refer to any place or organisation dedicated to code-breaking.

== See also ==
- Bulgarian medieval cryptography
- Black Chamber
- Black site
- ECHELON
- Postal censorship
- Secrecy of correspondence
