= Byron Price =

American journalist and government official (1891–1981)

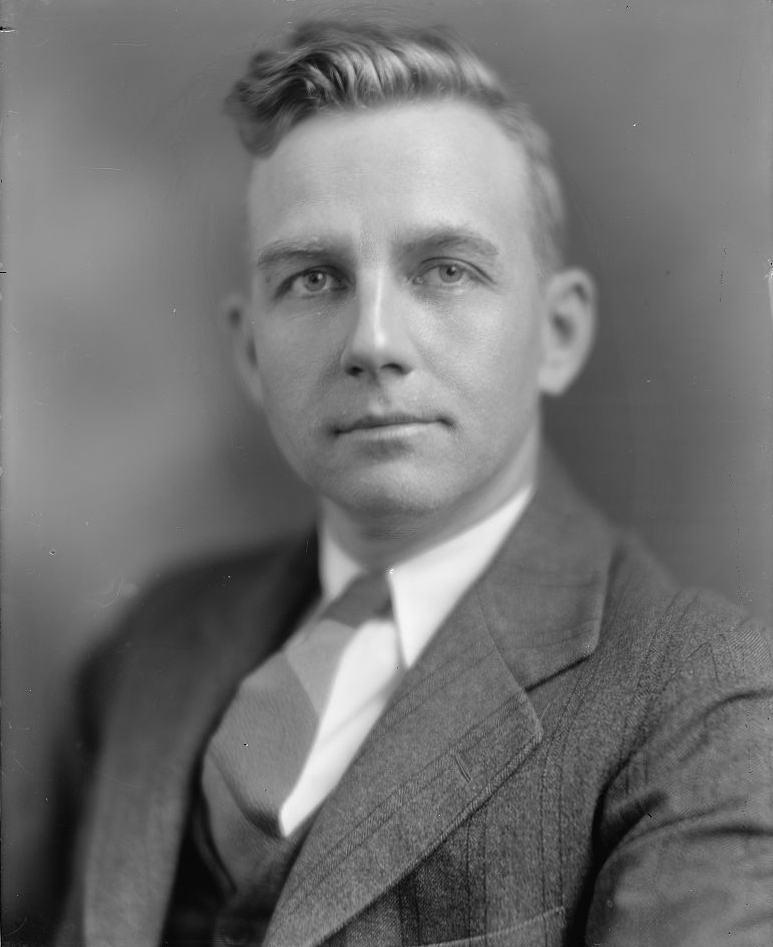
- Price before 1946

1st Director of The U.S. Office of Censorship
- In office December 20, 1941 – August 15, 1945
- President: Franklin D. Roosevelt; Harry S. Truman
- Preceded by: Office established
- Succeeded by: Office abolished

Personal details
- Born: March 25, 1891 Topeka, Indiana, U.S.
- Died: August 6, 1981 (aged 90) Henderson County, North Carolina, U.S.
- Citizenship: American
- Awards: Pulitzer Prize (1944); Medal for Merit (1946)

Byron Price (March 25, 1891 – August 6, 1981) was an American government official who served as the 1st and only director of the U.S. Office of Censorship from 1941 to 1945 under President Franklin D. Roosevelt and President Harry S. Truman during World War II.

== Life ==
Price was born near Topeka, Indiana, on 25 March 1891. He was a magazine editor at Topeka High School, and worked as a journalist and newspaper deliverer at the Crawfordsville Journal and the college newspaper while attending Wabash College.

He joined United Press in 1912 and the Associated Press (AP) soon after, where he stayed for 29 years except for two years in the United States Army during World War I. Price served as the AP's Washington bureau chief and, in 1937, became executive news editor of the organization. Price became the U.S. Director of Censorship on December 19, 1941. This was a day after the First War Powers Act was established. Heading the Office of Censorship allowed Price to censor international communication, issue censorship rules, and set up two advisory panels to assist him in his duties. For his "creation and administration of the newspaper and radio codes" at the Office of Censorship, Price received a special Pulitzer Prize in 1944. (Note: The Pulitzer citation continued, "At the same time, the members of the Advisory Board of the [Columbia University] Graduate School of Journalism deplore certain acts and policies of Army and Navy censorship in the handling of news at the source, and for the unreasonable suppression of information to which the American people are entitled.") In 1946, President Harry S. Truman presented him with the Medal for Merit for "exceptionally meritorious conduct in the performance of outstanding services as Director, Office of Censorship, from December 20, 1941, until August 15, 1945."

After the Office closed in November 1945, Price did not return to the AP. Instead he became a vice-president of the Motion Picture Association of America, then an Assistant Secretary General at the United Nations from 1947 until retiring in 1954. During the Cuban Missile Crisis in 1962, Price agreed to resume direction of censorship if war broke out with the Soviet Union. The Byron Price papers are located at the Wisconsin Historical Society in Madison, WI.
