= Postal censorship =

Inspection or examination of mail

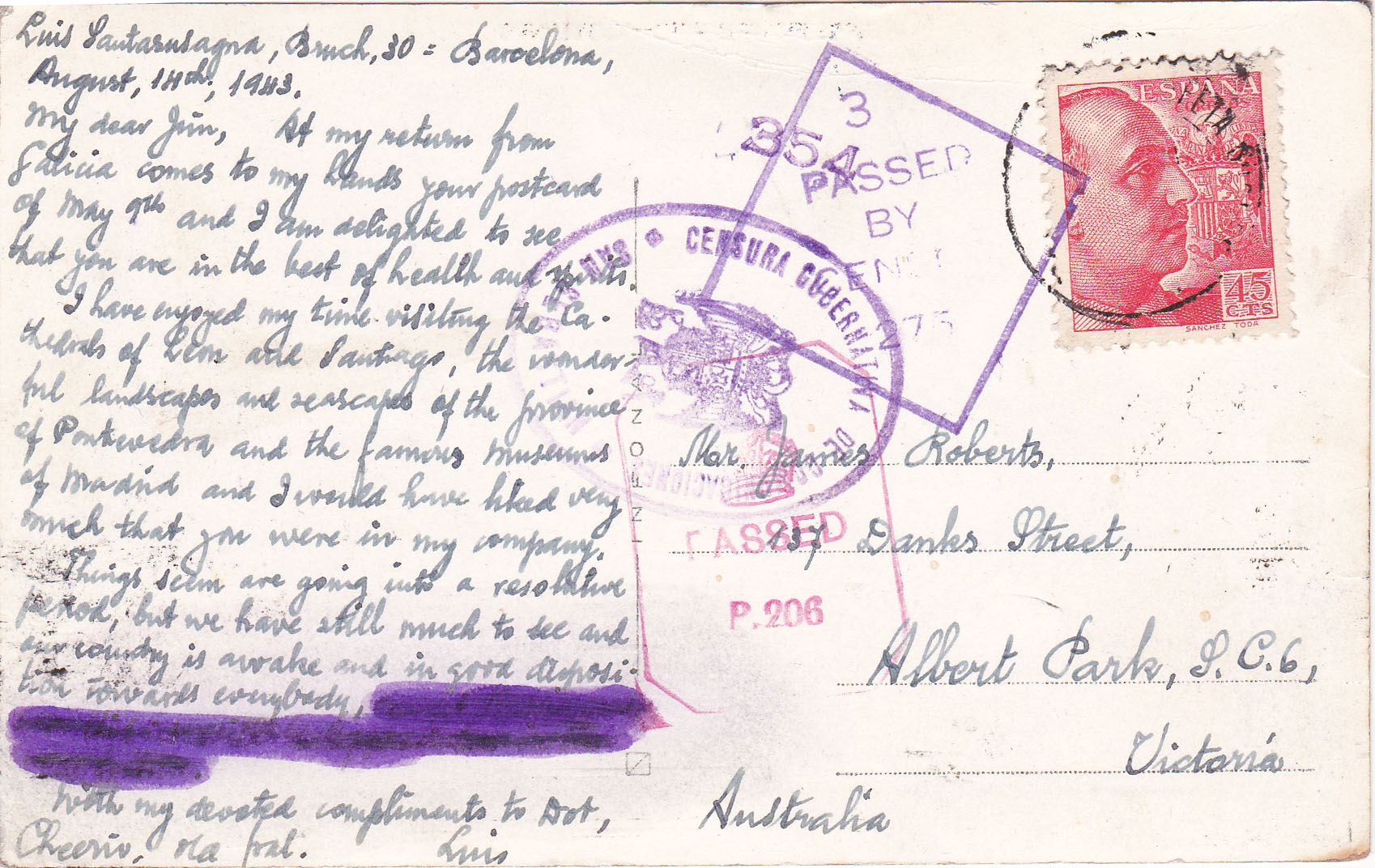
Part of message obliterated by indelible pencil

Postal censorship is the inspection or examination of mail, most often by governments. It can include opening, reading and total or selective obliteration of letters and their contents, as well as covers, postcards, parcels and other postal packets. Postal censorship takes place primarily but not exclusively during wartime (even though the nation concerned may not be at war, e.g. Ireland during 1939–1945) and periods of unrest, and occasionally at other times, such as periods of civil disorder or of a state of emergency. Both covert and overt postal censorship have occurred.

Historically, postal censorship is an ancient practice; it is usually linked to espionage and intelligence gathering. Both civilian mail and military mail may be subject to censorship, and often different organisations perform censorship of these types of mail. In 20th-century wars the objectives of postal censorship encompassed economic warfare, security and intelligence.

The study of postal censorship is a philatelic topic of postal history.

== Military mail ==
Military mail is not always censored by opening or reading the mail, but this is much more likely during wartime and military campaigns. The military postal service is usually separate from civilian mail and is usually totally controlled by the military. However, both civilian and military mail can be of interest to military intelligence, which has different requirements from civilian intelligence gathering. During wartime, mail from the front is often opened and offending parts blanked or cut out, and civilian mail may be subject to much the same treatment.

== Prisoner-of-war and internee mail ==
Postal censors reviewing mail to and from enemy prisoners of war, 1918

Prisoner-of-war and internee mail is also subject to postal censorship, which is permitted under Articles 70 and 71 of the Third Geneva Convention (1929–1949). It is frequently subjected to both military and civil postal censorship because it passes through both postal systems.

== Civilian mail ==
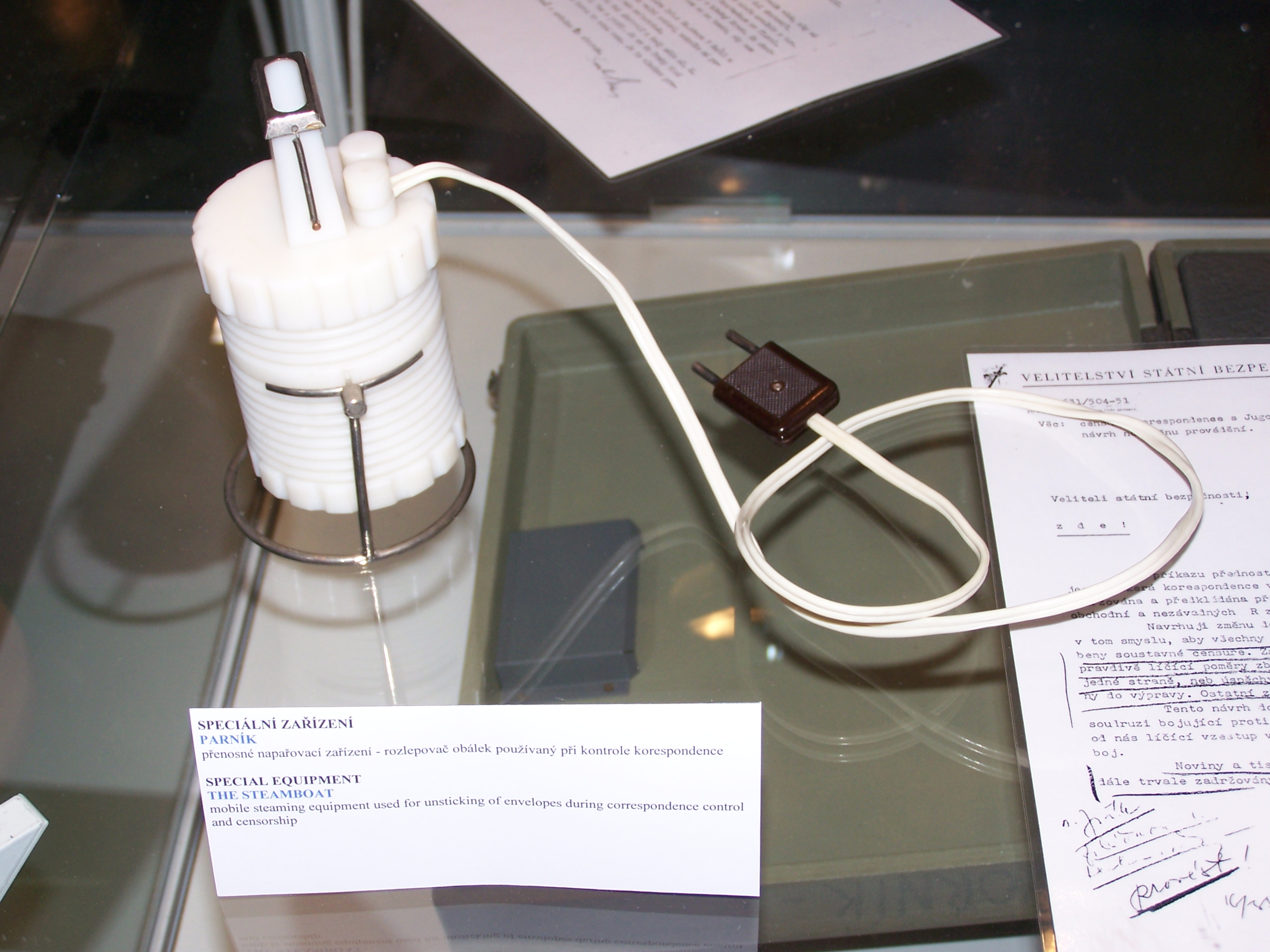
"The Steamboat" – mobile steaming equipment used by Czechoslovak StB for unsticking envelopes during correspondence surveillance and censorship

Until recent years, the monopoly for carrying civilian mails has usually been vested in governments, and that has facilitated their control of postal censorship. The type of information obtained from civilian mail is different from that likely to be found in military mail.

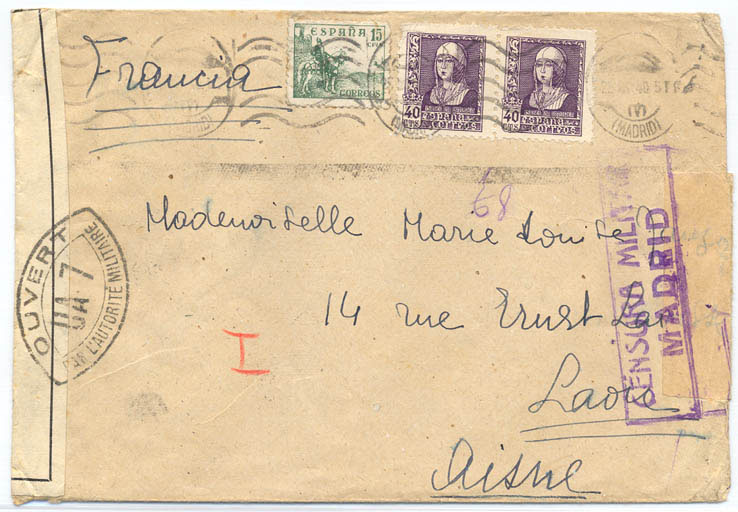
1940 civil cover from Madrid to Paris opened by both Spanish and French (Vichy) authorities

== Countries known to have enacted postal censorship ==
Throughout modern history, various governments, usually during times of war, would inspect mail coming into or leaving the country so as to prevent an enemy from corresponding with unfriendly entities within that country. There exist also many examples of prisoner of war mail from these countries which was also inspected or censored. Censored mail can usually be identified by various postmarks, dates, postage stamps and other markings found on the front and reverse side of the cover (envelope). These covers often have an adhesive seal, usually bearing special ID markings, which were applied to close and seal the envelope after inspection.

=== Britain and American colonies ===
During the years leading up to the American Revolution, the British monarchy in the American colonies manipulated the mail and newspapers sent between the various colonies in an effort to prevent them from being informed and from organizing with each other. Often mail would be outright destroyed.

=== American Civil War ===
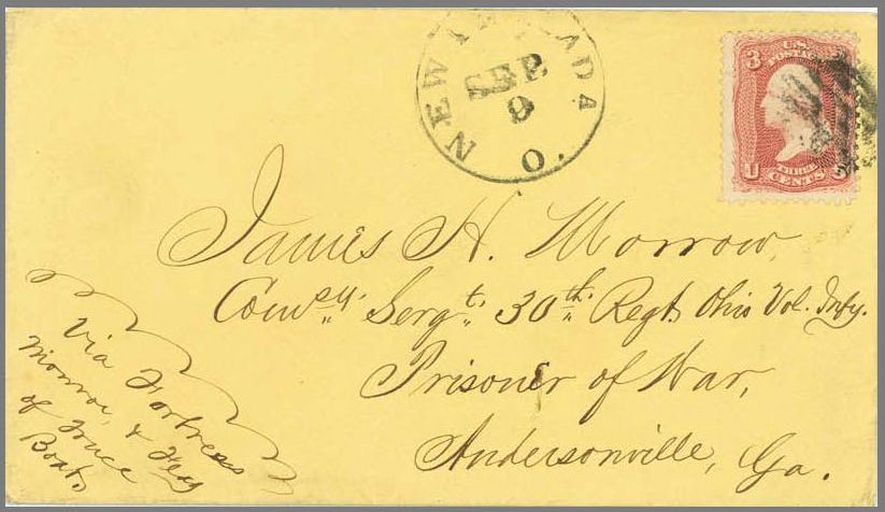
Prisoner of War cover to prisoner detained at Andersonville POW camp in Georgia

During the American Civil War both the Union and Confederate governments enacted postal censorship. The number of Union and Confederate soldiers in prisoner of war camps would reach an astonishing one and a half million men. The prison population at the Andersonville Confederate POW camp alone reached 45,000 men by the war's end. Consequently, there was much mail sent to and from soldiers held in POW installations. Mail going to or leaving prison camps in the North and South was inspected both before and after delivery. Mail crossing enemy lines was only allowed at two specific locations.

=== Pre-World War I ===
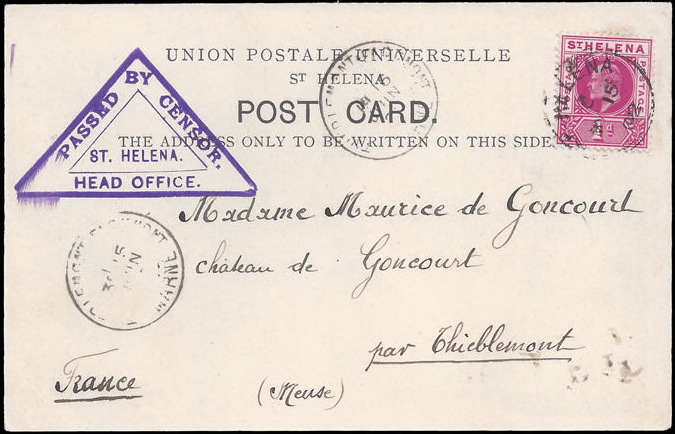
Second Boer War censored postcard from St. Helena to France in 1902

In Britain, the General Post Office was formed in 1657, and soon evolved a "Secret Office" for the purpose of intercepting, reading and deciphering coded correspondence from abroad. The existence of the Secret Office was made public in 1742 when it was found that in the preceding 10 years the sum of £45,675 (equivalent to £8,465,000 in 2024) had been secretly transferred from the Treasury to the General Post Office to fund the censorship activities. In 1782 responsibility for administering the Secret Office was transferred to the Foreign Secretary and it was finally abolished by Lord Palmerston in 1847.

During the Second Boer War a well planned censorship was implemented by the British that left them well experienced when The Great War started less than two decades later. Initially offices were in Pretoria and Durban and later throughout much of the Cape Colony as well a POW censorship with camps in Bloemfontein, St Helena, Ceylon, India and Bermuda.

The British Post Office Act 1908 allowed censorship upon issue of warrants by a secretary of state in both Great Britain and in the Channel Islands.

=== World War I ===
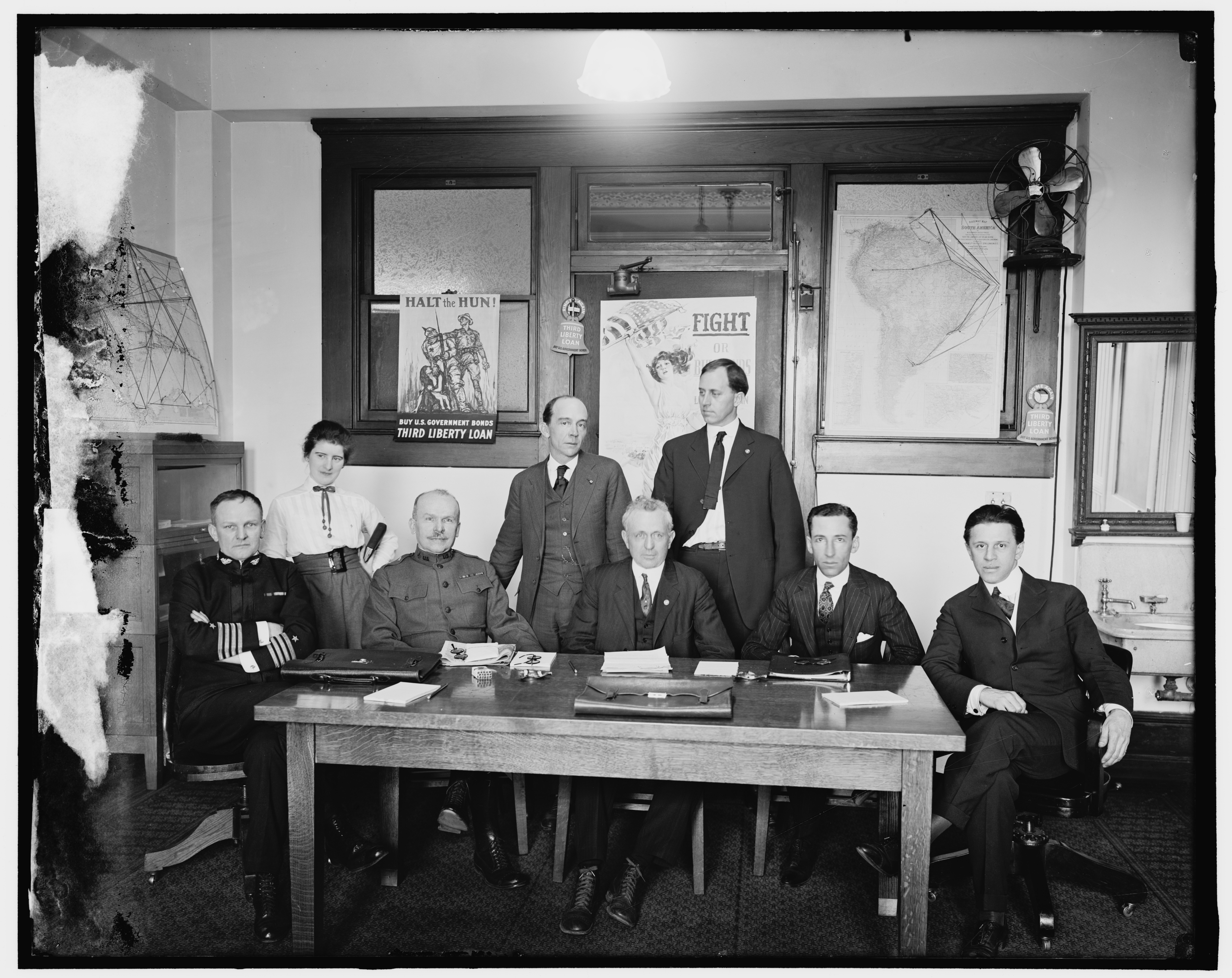
The Central Censorship Board was established in October 1917 to regulate mail and other communications between the U.S. and foreign nations. The Postmaster General was put in charge of censoring mail.

Censorship played an important role in the First World War. Each country involved utilized some form of censorship. This was a way to sustain an atmosphere of ignorance and give propaganda a chance to succeed. In response to the war, the United States Congress passed the Espionage Act of 1917 and Sedition Act of 1918. These gave broad powers to the government to censor the press through the use of fines, and later any criticism of the government, army, or sale of war bonds. The Espionage Act laid the groundwork for the establishment of a Central Censorship Board which oversaw censorship of communications including cable and mail.

Postal control was eventually introduced in all of the armies, to find the disclosure of military secrets and test the morale of soldiers. In Allied countries, civilians were also subjected to censorship. French censorship was modest and more targeted compared to the sweeping efforts made by the British and Americans. In Great Britain, all mail was sent to censorship offices in London or Liverpool. The United States sent mail to several centralized post offices as directed by the Central Censorship Board. American censors would only open mail related to Spain, Latin America or Asia—as their British allies were handling other countries. In one week alone, the San Antonio post office processed more than 75,000 letters, of which they controlled 77 percent (and held 20 percent for the following week).

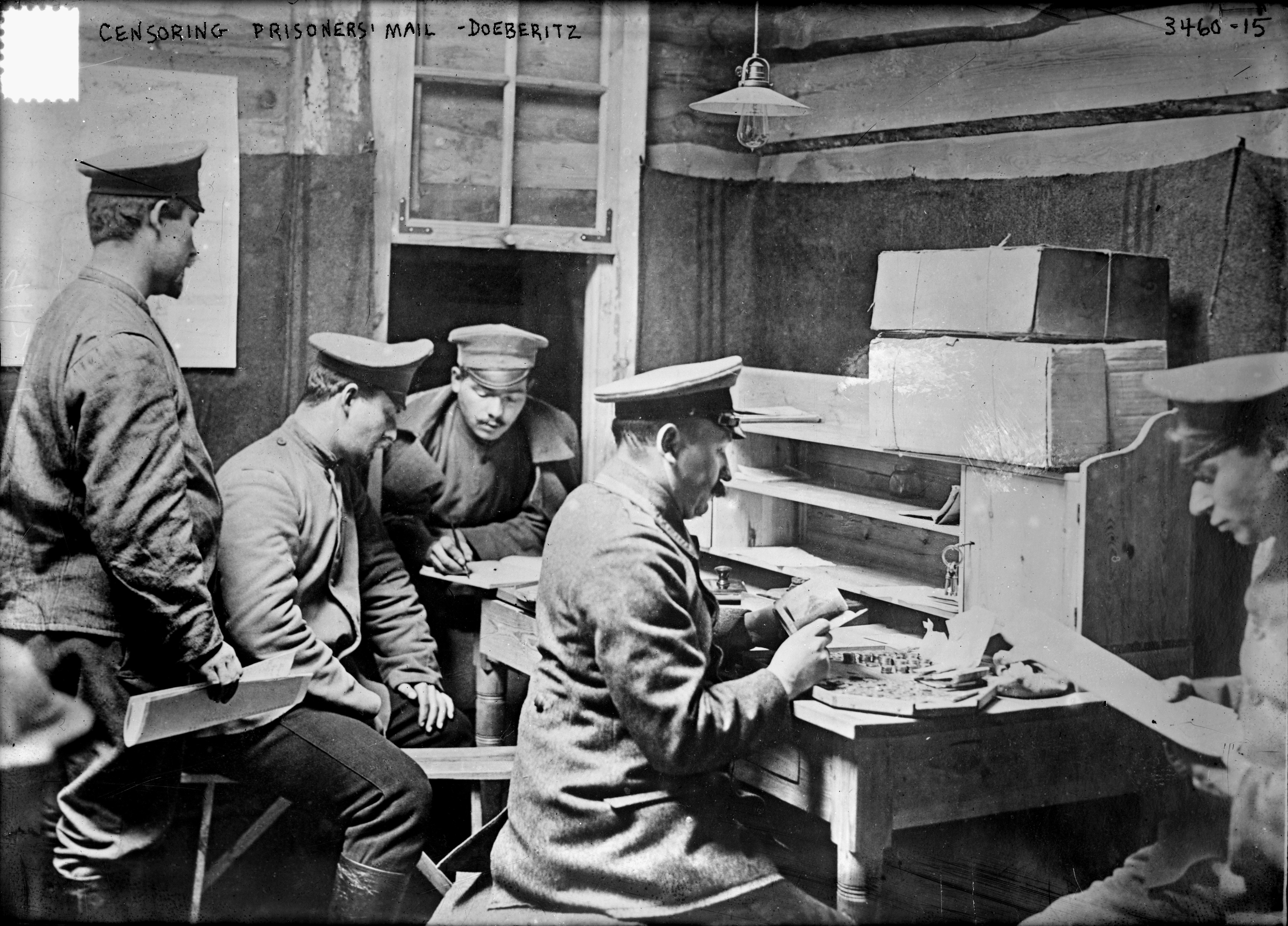
Soldiers checking the mail of prisoners at a prisoner of war camp at Döberitz, Germany, during World War I

Soldiers on the front developed strategies to circumvent censors. Some would go on "home leave" and take messages with them to post from a remote location. Those writing postcards in the field knew they were being censored, and deliberately held back controversial content and personal matters. Those writing home had a few options including free, government-issued field postcards, cheap, picture postcards, and embroidered cards meant as keepsakes. Unfortunately, censors often disapproved of picture postcards. In one case, French censors reviewed 23,000 letters and destroyed only 156 (although 149 of those were illustrated postcards). Censors in all warring countries also filtered out propaganda that disparaged the enemy or approved of atrocities. For example, German censors prevented postcards with hostile slogans such as "Jeder Stoß ein Franzos" ("Every hit a Frenchman") among others.

=== Between the wars ===
Following the end of World War I, there were some places where postal censorship was practiced. During 1919 it was operating in Austria, Belgium, Canada, German Weimar Republic and the Soviet Union as well as other territories. The Irish Civil War saw mail raided by the IRA that was marked as censored and sometimes opened in the newly independent state. The National Army also opened mail and censorship of irregulars' mail in prisons took place.

Other conflicts during which censorship existed included the Third Anglo-Afghan War, Chaco War, were the Italian occupation of Ethiopia (1935–36) and especially during the Spanish Civil War of 1936–1939.

=== World War II ===
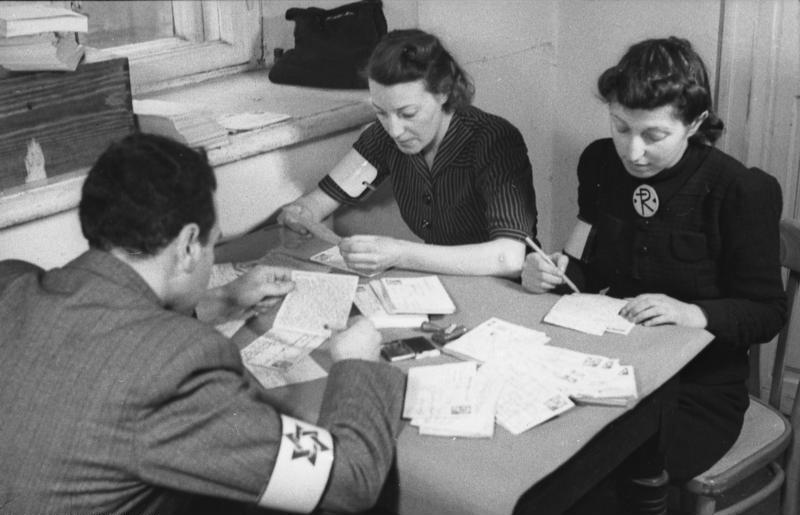
Jewish censor staff in Warsaw Ghetto during 1941

During World War II, both the Allies and Axis instituted postal censorship of civil mail. The largest organisations were those of the United States, though the United Kingdom employed about 10,000 censor staff while Ireland, a small neutral country, only employed about 160 censors.

Both blacklists and whitelists were employed to observe suspicious mail or listed those whose mail was exempt from censorship.

==== German censorship ====
Germany had an extensive censorship system both in Germany and in their occupied territories. Each station was assigned a letter code that was used in their handstamps and censor labels.

German censor stations
Code	Station	Type of mail
a	Königsberg	Baltic States, Soviet Union
b	Berlin	transit, airmail South, North America, Finland
c	Cologne	Netherlands, Belgium, Luxembourg, France
d	Munich	Italy, Spain, Portugal, Switzerland
e	Frankfurt	Switzerland, South and North America, southern France
f	Hamburg	Scandinavian countries non-airmail
g	Vienna	Balkan countries, Hungary, Turkey
h	Berlin	POW after 1944
k	Copenhagen	Sweden, Norway, Finland
l	Lyon	to and from southern France, transit mail
n	Nancy	southern France and Neutral Hinterland
o	Oslo	Sweden, Finland, Denmark
t	Trondheim	Sweden
x	Paris	Zone Post, Red Cross mail, Belgium, Netherlands
y	Bordeaux	to and from southern France, transit mail

==== Imperial censorship ====
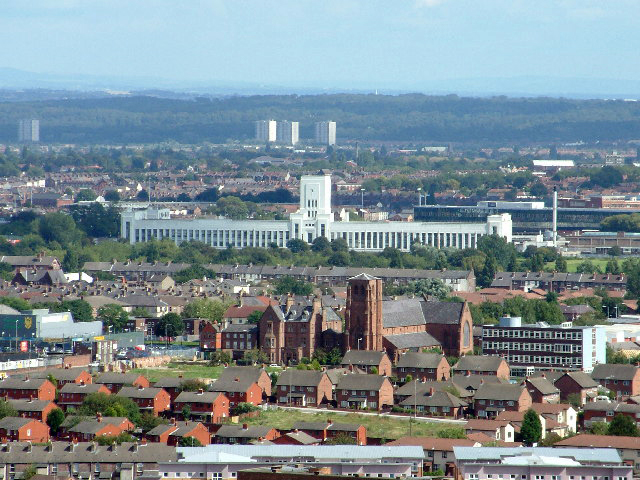
Littlewoods building where much of the British postal censorship took place

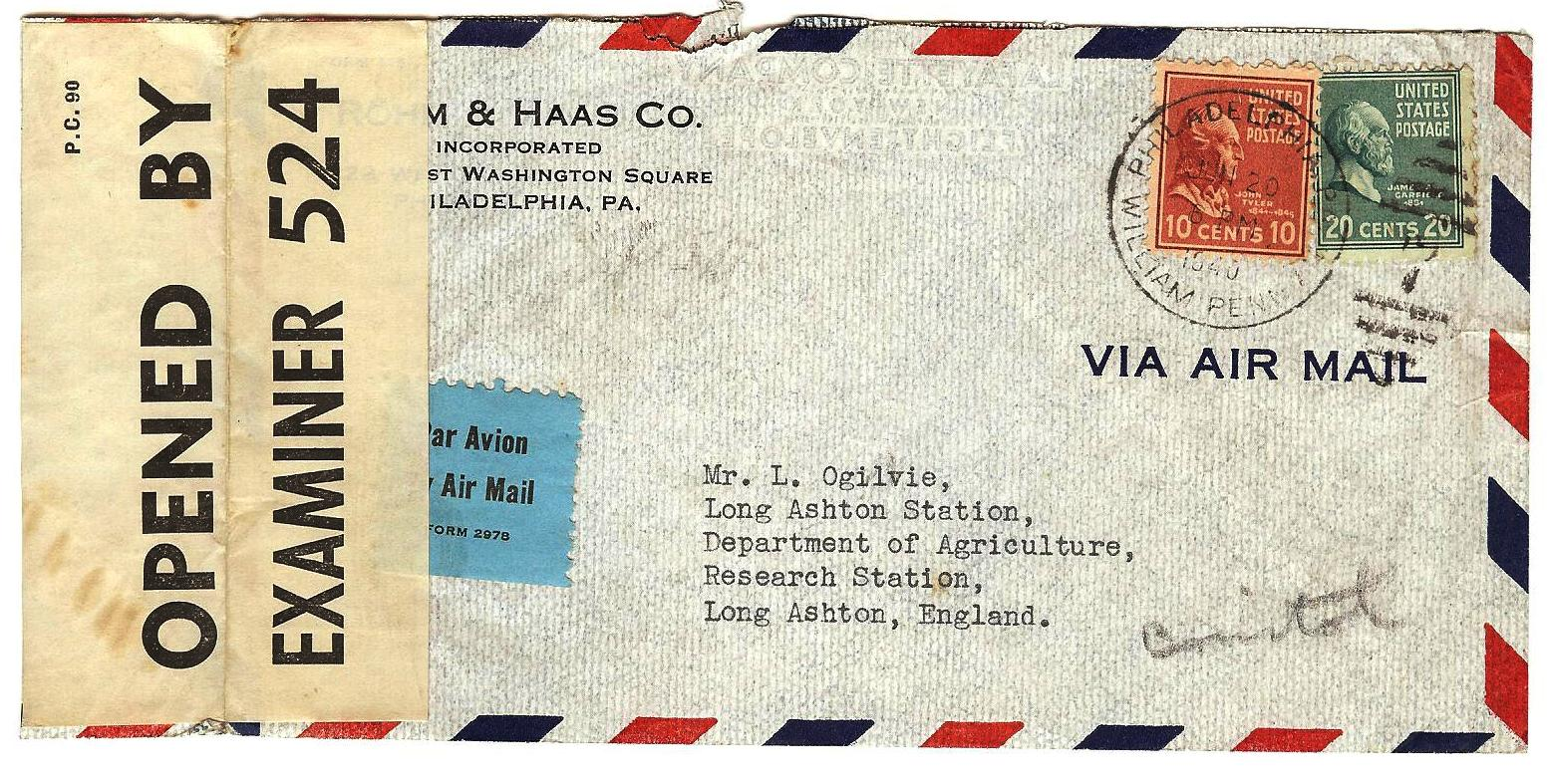
1940 airmail letter from neutral US to England, where it was censored because they were already at war, using a P.C.90 coded censor sealing label

British censorship was primarily based in the Littlewoods football pools building in Liverpool with nearly 20 other censor stations around the country. Additionally the British censored colonial and dominion mail at censor stations in the following places:

Dominions: Australia, Canada, Newfoundland, New Zealand, Southern Rhodesia (not a dominion but supervised by the Dominion office) and Union of South Africa
Colonies: Aden, Antigua, Ascension Island, Bahamas, Bahrain, Barbados, Bermuda, Ceylon, Cyprus, Dominica, Egypt, Falkland Islands, Fiji, Gambia, Gibraltar, Gilbert and Ellice Islands, Gold Coast, Grenada, British Guiana, British Honduras, Hong Kong, Jamaica, Kenya, Malaya, Malta, Mauritius, Montserrat, New Hebrides, Nigeria, North Borneo, Northern Rhodesia, Nyasaland, Palestine, Penang, St. Helena, St. Lucia, St. Kitts and Nevis, St. Vincent, Sarawak, Seychelles, Sierra Leone, British Solomon Islands, Somalia, Sudan, Tanganyika, Trinidad, Tonga, Uganda, Virgin Islands and Zanzibar,

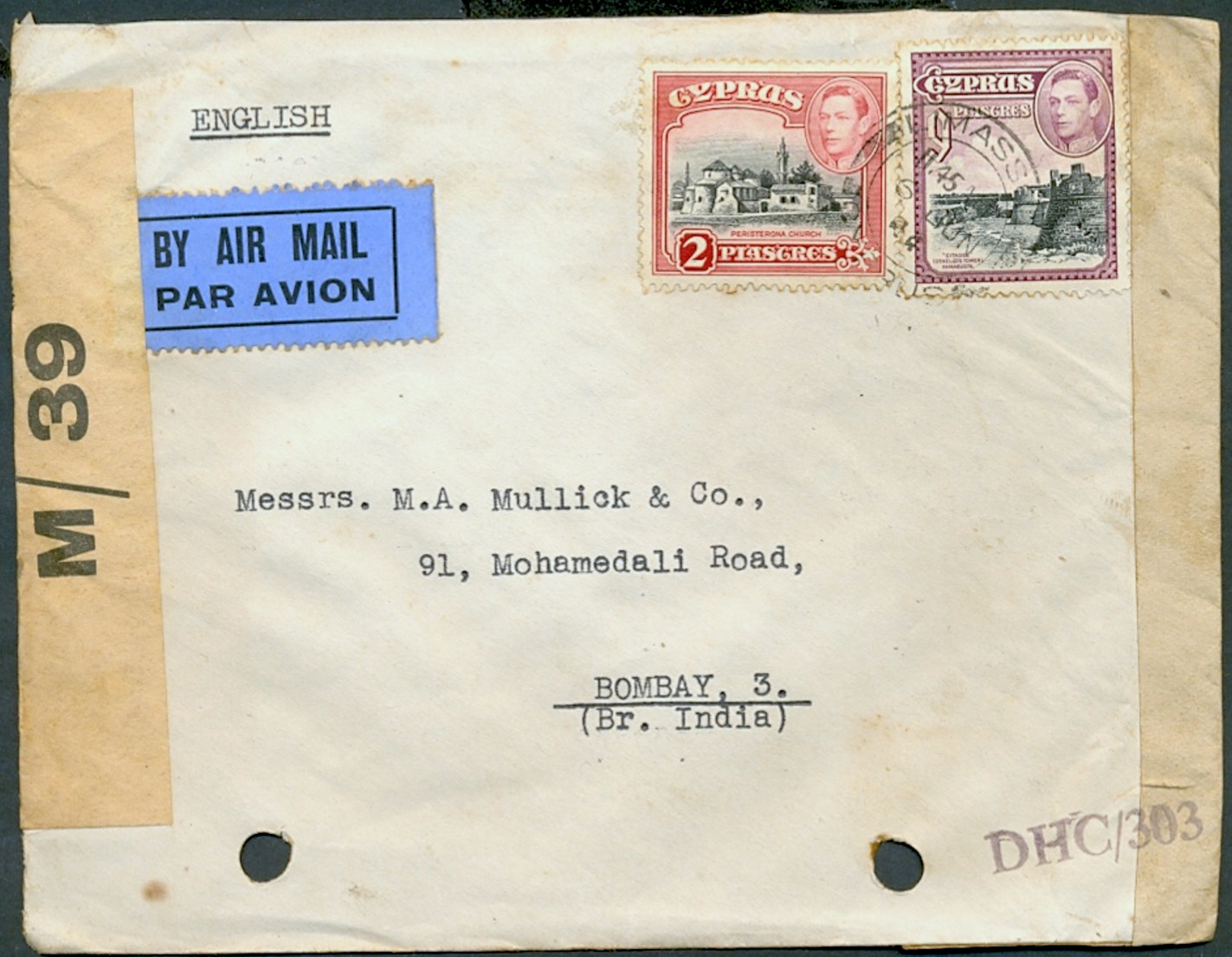
Censored cover from Cyprus to India in 1944 tied opened at left with censor label showing the use of the Cyprus censor code M/(number) with the censor number

Imperial colonies
Code	Country	Code	Country
A/IA	Gibraltar	AA	Montserrat
B/IB	Antigua	BB	St. Kitts & Nevis
C/IC	Bermuda	CC	Virgin Isle
D/ID	Jamaica	DD	Malta
E/IE	Trinidad	EE	Mauritius
F	Adan	FF	Malaya/Singapore
G/IG	Bahamas	GG	Penang
H/IH	Barbados	HH	Sarawak
I/II	British Guiana	II	North Borneo
J	British Honduras	JJ	New Hebrides
K	British Solomon Islands	KK	Palestine
L	Ceylon	LL	Seychelle Island
M	Cyprus	MM	Sudan
N	Kenya & Uganda	NN	Gambia
O	Northern Rhodesia	OO	Gold Coast
P	United Kingdom	PP	Nigeria
Q	Nyasaland	QQ	Sierra Leone
R	Tanganyika	RR	Dominica
S	United Kingdom	SS/ISS	Grenada
T	United Kingdom	TT/ITT	St. Lucia
U	Zanzibar	UU	St. Vincent
V	Egypt	VV	St. Helena
W	Falkland Islands	WW	Tonga
X	Fuji	XX	Ascension Island
Y	Gilbert & Ellice Island	YY	Somalia
Z	Hong Kong	ZZ	Eritrea

==== United States ====
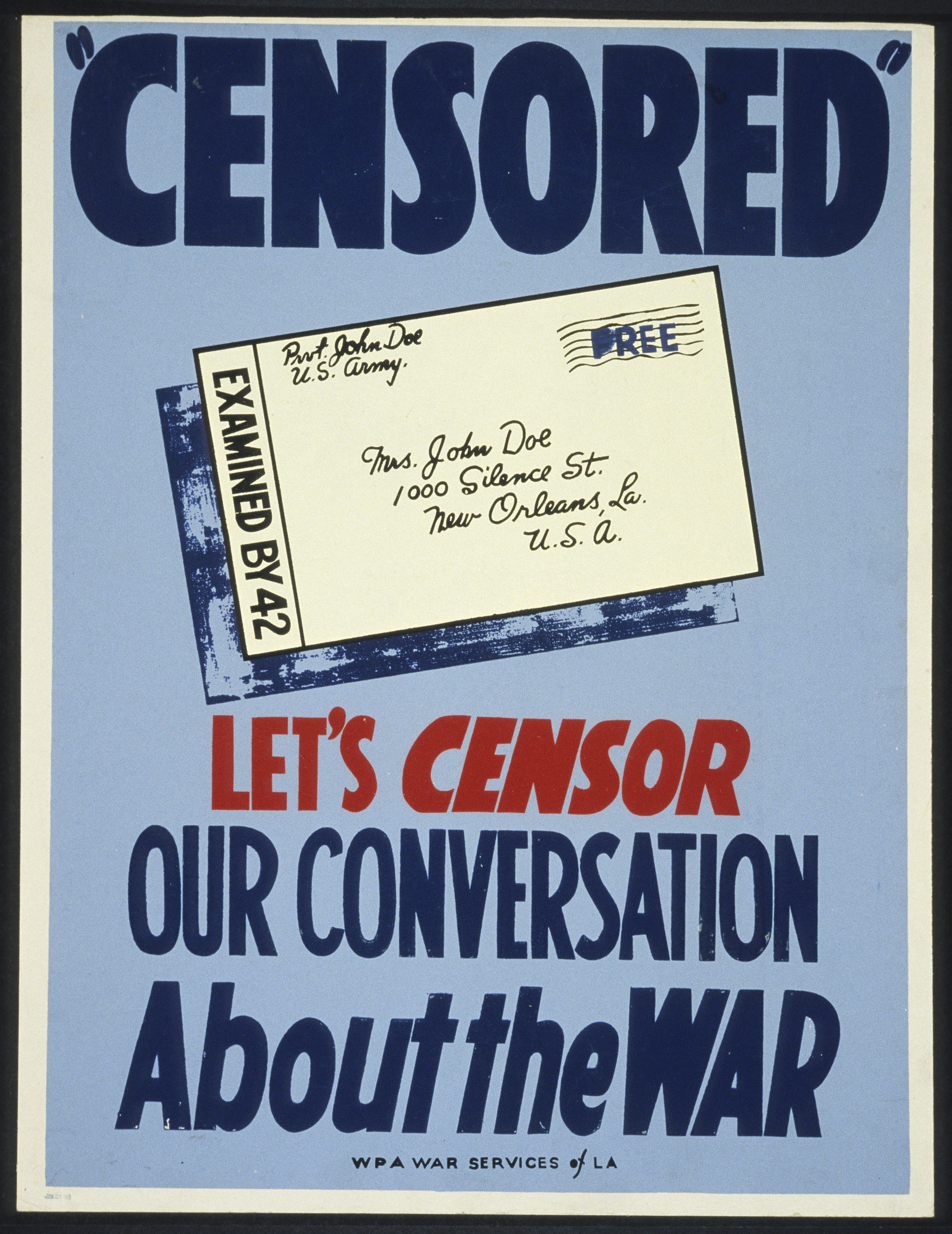
US WPA poster, 1943

In the United States censorship was under the control of the Office of Censorship whose staff count rose to 14,462 by February 1943 in the censor stations they opened in New York, Miami, New Orleans, San Antonio, Laredo, Brownsville, El Paso, Nogales, Los Angeles, San Francisco, Seattle, Chicago, San Juan, Charlotte Amalie, Balboa, Cristóbal, David, Panama, Honolulu, Pago Pago and Washington, D.C.

The United States blacklist, known as U.S. Censorship Watch List, contained 16,117 names.

==== Neutral countries ====
Neutral countries such as Ireland, Portugal and Switzerland also censored mail even though they were not directly involved in the conflict.

=== Post-World War II ===
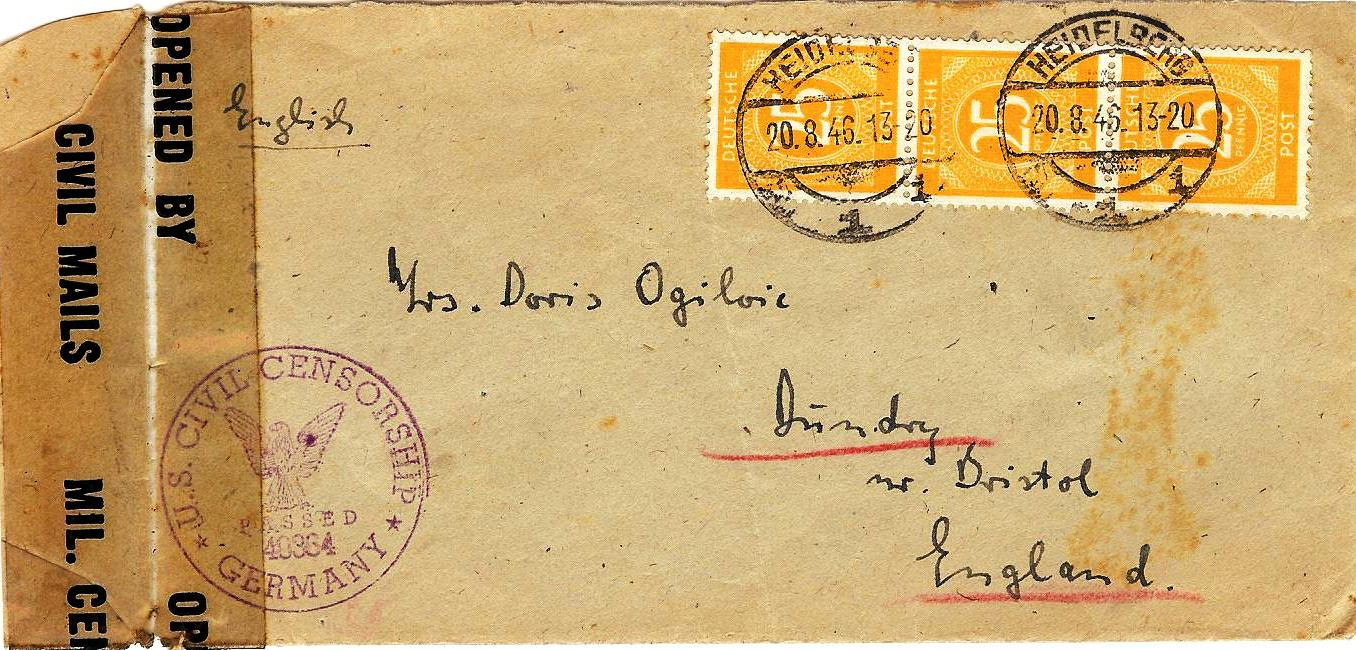
1946 censored letter (15x8 cm) from Heidelberg then in the US-controlled zone of West Germany to England. Note "English" as the language of the enclosed letter.

Following the end of hostilities in Europe, Germany was occupied by the Allied Powers in zones of control. Censorship of mail that had been impounded during the Allies advances, when postal services were suspended, took place in each zone though by far the least commonly seen mail is from the French Zone. When most of the backlog had been cleared regular mail was controlled as well as in occupied Austria. Soviet zone mail is considered scarce.

In the German Democratic Republic, the Stasi, established in 1950, were responsible for the control of incoming and outgoing mail; at their height of operations, their postal monitoring department controlled about 90,000 pieces of mail daily.

Several small conflicts saw periods of postal censorship, such as the 1948 Palestine war, Korean War (1950–1953), Poland (1980s), or even the 44-day Costa Rican Civil War in 1948.

== See also ==
- American Civil War prisoner of war mail
- Black room
- Cabinet noir
- Comstock Act
- Israeli Military Censor
- Mail censorship in Ireland
- Secrecy of correspondence
- United States Office of Censorship

== References and notes ==
Notes

Books

- Mark FRPSL, Graham (2000). British Censorship of Civil Mails During World War I. Bristol, UK: Stuart Rossiter Trust. ISBN 0-9530004-1-9.
- Little, D.J. (2000). British Empire Civil Censorship Devices, World War II: Colonies and Occupied Territories - Africa, Section 1. UK: Civil Censorship Study Group. ISBN 0-9517444-0-2.
- Torrance, A.R., & Morenweiser, K. (1991). British Empire Civil Censorship Devices, World War II: United Kingdom, Section 2. UK: Civil Censorship Study Group. ISBN 0-9517444-1-0.
- Stich, Dr. H.F., Stich, W., Sprecht, J. (1993). Civil and Military Censorship During World War II. Canada: Stich, Stich and Sprecht. ISBN 0-9693788-2-3.
- Wolter, Karl Kurt (1965). Die Postzensur: Band I - Vorzeit, Früheit und Neuzeit (bis 1939). Munich: Georg Amm.
- Herbert, E.S.; des Graz, C.G., eds. (1996). History of the Postal and Telegraph Censorship Department 1938–1946 Volume I & II. Civil Censorship Study Group by permission of Public Record Office, Kew, UK.
- Harrison, Galen D. (1997). Prisoners' Mail from the American Civil War. Dexter, MI: Galen D. Harrison (?).

Papers & reports

- Pfau, Ann (27 September 2008). "Postal Censorship and Military Intelligence during World War II" (PDF). National Postal Museum.
- Price, Byron (15 November 1945). "Report on the Office of Censorship" (PDF). United States Government Printing Office.
- Whyman, Susan E. "Postal Censorship in England 1635–1844" (PDF). Postcomm. Archived from the original (PDF) on 28 February 2008.
