= Secrecy of correspondence =

Legal right to privacy in some European nations

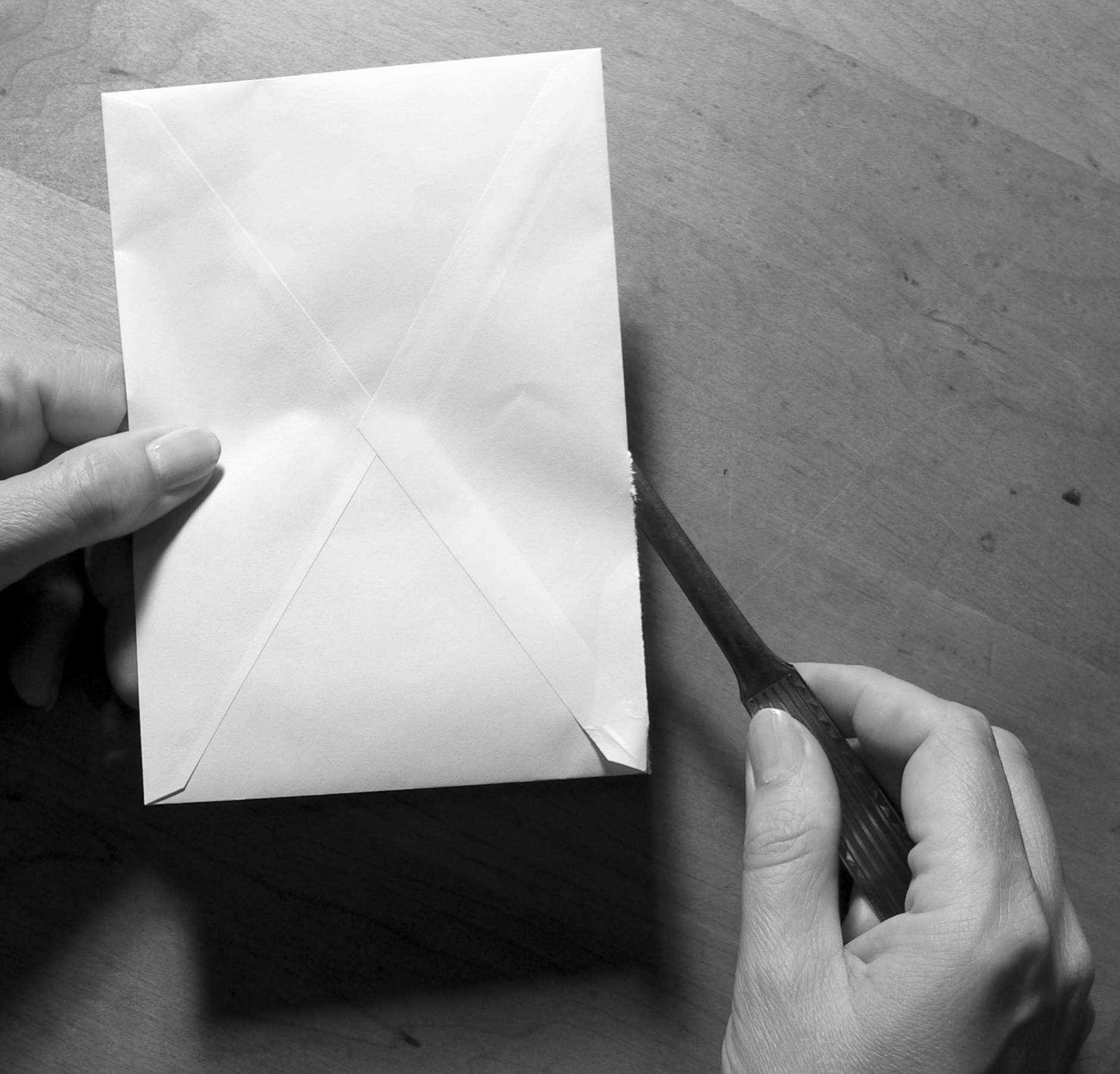
The unauthorized opening of a letter before its delivery is generally considered a crime.

The secrecy of correspondence (German: Briefgeheimnis, French: secret de la correspondance) or literally translated as secrecy of letters, is a fundamental legal principle enshrined in the constitutions of several European countries. It guarantees that the content of sealed letters is never revealed, and that letters in transit are not opened by government officials, or any other third party. The right of privacy to one's own letters is the main legal basis for the assumption of privacy of correspondence.

The principle has been naturally extended to other forms of communication, including telephony and electronic communications on the Internet, as the constitutional guarantees are generally thought to also cover these forms of communication. However, national telecommunications privacy laws may allow lawful interception, i.e. wiretapping and monitoring of electronic communications in cases of suspicion of crime. Paper letters have, in most jurisdictions, remained outside the legal scope of law enforcement surveillance, even in cases of "reasonable searches and seizures".

When applied to electronic communication, the principle protects not only the content of the communication, but also the information on when and to whom any messages (if any) have been sent, and in the case of mobile communication, the location information of the mobile units. As a consequence, in jurisdictions with a safeguard on secrecy of letters, location data collected from mobile phone networks has a higher level of protection than data collected by vehicle telematics or transport tickets.

== United States ==
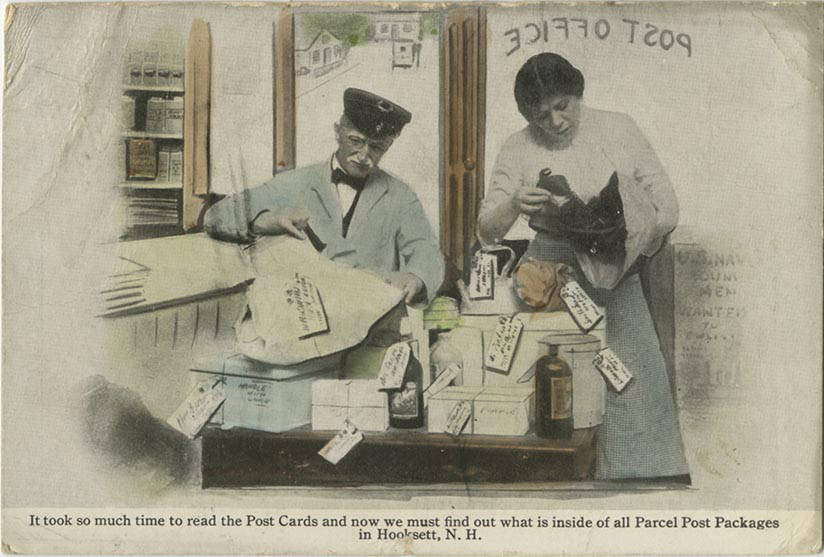
Humor postcard; "It took so much time to read the Post Cards and now we must find out what is inside of all Parcel Post Packages"

In the United States, there is no specific constitutional guarantee on the privacy of correspondence. The secrecy of letters and correspondence is derived through litigation from the Fourth Amendment to the United States Constitution. In an 1877 case, the U.S. Supreme Court stated:

No law of Congress can place in the hands of officials connected with the Postal Service any authority to invade the secrecy of letters and such sealed packages in the mail; and all regulations adopted as to mail matter of this kind must be in subordination to the great principle embodied in the fourth amendment of the Constitution.

The protection of the Fourth Amendment has been extended beyond the home in other instances. Unlike other jurisdictions it does not protect foreigners abroad. In the Supreme Court case California v. Greenwood, protections similar to those afforded to correspondence have even been argued to extend to the contents of trash cans outside one's house, although it turned out to be unsuccessful. Like all rights derived through litigation, the secrecy of correspondence is subject to interpretation. By Supreme Court precedent, rights derived from the Fourth Amendment are limited by the legal test of a "reasonable expectation of privacy".

== See also ==
- Black room
- Data privacy
- Dead letter
- Electronic Communications Privacy Act
- Katz v. United States
- Lawful interception
- Letterlocking
- Postal censorship
- Telecommunications data retention
