= Sentralanlegget =

Norwegian government nuclear bunker

Coordinates: 60°4′49″N 010°20′31″E

Sentralanlegget (lit. The Central Facility) is the war headquarters of the Norwegian government, built during the Cold War. The facility is located in Hole municipality in Buskerud County, and designed as an underground shelter in the west side of the mountain Kongens utsikt, meant to withstand a hit from a nuclear missile from the east.

== History ==
Sentralanlegget was built by the civil defense authority during the 1960s. The Cold War and the threats represented by the Soviet Union made it necessary to build a facility where members of the Norwegian royal family, members of the government and other key personnel could evacuate to in case of a military attack on the nation.

Hole municipality was chosen due to its massive mountain range, ideal for an underground shelter, and because of its relative proximity to the governmental offices and the Royal Palace in Oslo.

The end of the Cold War marked a change in the threats against Norway, as the neighboring Soviet Union no longer existed. Seen in the light of the modern world, this facility is now outdated in many ways. Nevertheless, it is still in operation and can be used if necessary.

During the 1980s, the Norwegian government built a new, smaller and more modern war headquarter in a bunker under the governmental offices in Oslo. This, though, can not accommodate a larger number of persons for a longer time.

== Function ==
Sentralanlegget has two main entrances located some three hundred meters apart. From these, tunnels lead to the facility inside the mountain.

The facility can accommodate 600 persons for months, and includes a hospital, restaurant/bar, communication central, conference rooms, situation room, private rooms for members of the government and the royal family and storage rooms for supplies.

The facility is self-contained with power, water, air and food. It is the Directorate for Civil Protection and Emergency Planning that is responsible for the daily operation of Sentralanlegget. The Ministry of Justice and the Police and the Prime Ministers Office are also involved.

== Secrecy ==
Due to the sensitive nature of such a facility, location and technical details are classified. The entrances are digitally removed from aerial photos in Norwegian internet search engines.

During the 1980s, journalists in a newspaper for a leftist pacifist organisation were threatened with legal action by the Prime Ministers Office if they published a story on the facility.

In April 2010, the Norwegian Broadcasting Corporation reported that phone numbers, address, and the number of employees could be found in Norwegian search engines and telephone books. All information was provided by the Directorate for Civil Protection and Emergency Planning, most likely caused by a human error. Journalists also found technical drawings and lists of security cleared personnel lying open for everyone in the Norwegian state archive. These were later withdrawn.

In 2018, Aftenposten reported that the bus stop in front of the secret entrance was called "NATO-facility".

== Notes ==
- http://www.nrk.no/nyheter/norge/1.7069626 (in Norwegian) Story from Norwegian Broadcasting on the security faults
- http://www.ivarjohansen.no/temaer/internasjonal-politikk/2388-krigshovedkvarter-regjeringen.html (in Norwegian) Blog from one of the authors of the 1987 story that was threatened with legal action
- https://web.archive.org/web/20100415062634/http://io.no/info/sentralanlegget-398599 Address and phone number
- http://kart.gulesider.no/m/pVyrs Aerial photo of the area (entrances removed digitally)
- http://www.nrk.no/nyheter/norge/1.7076950 (in Norwegian) Story telling that archives including drawings of the facility has been withdrawn
