= Wartime Information Security Program =

The Wartime Information Security Program (abbreviated WISP) was a Cold War-era group that would have been responsible for censorship in the aftermath of a nuclear war. In such a situation, emergency powers would grant this group of eight officials authority over all United States media and all other communications that entered or left the country.

The members of WISP and their support staff would take refuge and operate out of a specially constructed bunker in the basement of a building at McDaniel College (then known as Western Maryland College) in Westminster, Maryland. The original location was in Thompson Hall, at the time the infirmary. It was later relocated to Lewis Hall, a science building, where it remained until the government relinquished its several-thousand-square-foot space back to the college around 1990.

The group was originally created as the United States Office of Censorship under President Dwight David Eisenhower, but was later renamed to avoid negative connotations associated with the word "censorship". The program was defunded in 1974.

== See also ==
- Continuity of government
