= List of United States federal executive orders =

This page is a list of Executive orders which have been issued by the Office of the President of the United States of America (POTUS) to give specific presidential policy and implementation directions to officers and agencies of this country's Executive branch. Federal government offices and agencies are required to follow the directions of such Executive orders, within the limits of existing federal laws passed by the United States Congress and defined by the Constitution of the United States, as interpreted by the Judicial branch of the federal government.

At the federal level of government in the United States, laws are made almost exclusively by legislation. Such legislation originates as an act of Congress passed by the U.S. Congress; such acts were either signed into law by the president or passed by Congress after a presidential veto.

Legislation is not the only source of law. There is also judge-made common law and constitutional law. The president can also issue executive orders pursuant to a grant of discretion from Congress, or under the inherent powers that office holds to deal with certain matters which have the force of law.

Many early executive orders were not recorded. The State Department began numbering executive orders in the early 20th century, starting retroactively from President Abraham Lincoln's Executive Order Establishing a Provisional Court in Louisiana issued in 1862.

== Consolidated list by president ==
#	President	Party	Total executive orders	Order number range	Years in office	Executive orders per year	Period
1	George Washington	Independent	8	Unnumbered	7.95	1.0	April 30, 1789 – March 4, 1797
2	John Adams	Federalist	1	Unnumbered	4	0.3	March 4, 1797 – March 4, 1801
3	Thomas Jefferson	Democratic-Republican	4	Unnumbered	8	0.5	March 4, 1801 – March 4, 1809
4	James Madison	Democratic-Republican	1	Unnumbered	8	0.1	March 4, 1809 – March 4, 1817
5	James Monroe	Democratic-Republican	1	Unnumbered	8	0.1	March 4, 1817 – March 4, 1825
6	John Quincy Adams	Democratic-Republican	3	Unnumbered	4	0.8	March 4, 1825 – March 4, 1829
7	Andrew Jackson	Democratic	12	Unnumbered	8	1.5	March 4, 1829 – March 4, 1837
8	Martin Van Buren	Democratic	10	Unnumbered	4	2.5	March 4, 1837 – March 4, 1841
9	William Henry Harrison	Whig	0	Unnumbered	0.08	0.0	March 4, 1841 – April 4, 1841
10	John Tyler	Whig	17	Unnumbered	3.92	4.3	April 4, 1841 – March 4, 1845
11	James K. Polk	Democratic	18	Unnumbered	4	4.5	March 4, 1845 – March 4, 1849
12	Zachary Taylor	Whig	5	Unnumbered	1.34	3.7	March 4, 1849 – July 9, 1850
13	Millard Fillmore	Whig	12	Unnumbered	2.66	4.5	July 9, 1850 – March 4, 1853
14	Franklin Pierce	Democratic	35	Unnumbered	4	8.8	March 4, 1853 – March 4, 1857
15	James Buchanan	Democratic	16	Unnumbered	4	4.0	March 4, 1857 – March 4, 1861
16	Abraham Lincoln	Republican	48	Unnumbered	4.11	11.7	March 4, 1861 – April 15, 1865
17	Andrew Johnson	Democratic	79	Unnumbered	3.89	20.3	April 15, 1865 – March 4, 1869
18	Ulysses S. Grant	Republican	217	Unnumbered	8	27.1	March 4, 1869 – March 4, 1877
19	Rutherford B. Hayes	Republican	92	Unnumbered	4	23.0	March 4, 1877 – March 4, 1881
20	James A. Garfield	Republican	0	Unnumbered	0.54	0	March 4, 1881 – September 19, 1881
21	Chester A. Arthur	Republican	96	Unnumbered	3.46	27.7	September 19, 1881 – March 4, 1885
22	Grover Cleveland (first term)	Democratic	113	Unnumbered	4	28.3	March 4, 1885 – March 4, 1889
23	Benjamin Harrison	Republican	143	Unnumbered	4	35.8	March 4, 1889 – March 4, 1893
24	Grover Cleveland (second term)	Democratic	140	Unnumbered	4	35.0	March 4, 1893 – March 4, 1897
25	William McKinley	Republican	185	97–140	4.53	40.9	March 4, 1897 – September 14, 1901
26	Theodore Roosevelt	Republican	1,081	141–1050	7.47	144.7	September 14, 1901 – March 4, 1909
27	William Howard Taft	Republican	80	1051–1743	4	26.6	March 4, 1909 – March 4, 1913
28	Woodrow Wilson	Democratic	1,803	1744–3415	8	225.4	March 4, 1913 – March 4, 1921
29	Warren G. Harding	Republican	59	3416–3885	2.41	24.48	March 4, 1921 – August 2, 1923
30	Calvin Coolidge	Republican	1,203	3885-A–5075	5.59	215.2	August 2, 1923 – March 4, 1929
31	Herbert Hoover	Republican	968	5076–6070	4	242	March 4, 1929 – March 4, 1933
32	Franklin D. Roosevelt	Democratic	3,721	6071–9537	12.11	307.8	March 4, 1933 – April 12, 1945
33	Harry S. Truman	Democratic	907	9538–10431	7.77	116.7	April 12, 1945 – January 20, 1953
34	Dwight D. Eisenhower	Republican	484	10432–10913	8	60.5	January 20, 1953 – January 20, 1961
35	John F. Kennedy	Democratic	214	10914–11127	2.84	75.4	January 20, 1961 – November 22, 1963
36	Lyndon B. Johnson	Democratic	325	11128–11451	5.16	62.9	November 22, 1963 – January 20, 1969
37	Richard Nixon	Republican	346	11452–11797	5.56	62.3	January 20, 1969 – August 9, 1974
38	Gerald Ford	Republican	169	11798–11966	2.45	69.1	August 9, 1974 – January 20, 1977
39	Jimmy Carter	Democratic	320	11967–12286	4	80.0	January 20, 1977 – January 20, 1981
40	Ronald Reagan	Republican	381	12287–12667	8	47.6	January 20, 1981 – January 20, 1989
41	George H. W. Bush	Republican	166	12668–12833	4	41.5	January 20, 1989 – January 20, 1993
42	Bill Clinton	Democratic	364	12834–13197	8	45.5	January 20, 1993 – January 20, 2001
43	George W. Bush	Republican	291	13198–13488	8	36.4	January 20, 2001 – January 20, 2009
44	Barack Obama	Democratic	276	13489–13764	8	34.6	January 20, 2009 – January 20, 2017
45	Donald Trump (first term)	Republican	220	13765–13984	4	55.0	January 20, 2017 – January 20, 2021
46	Joe Biden	Democratic	162	13985–14144	4	40	January 20, 2021 – January 20, 2025
47	Donald Trump (second term)	Republican	290	14145 and above	1.8	—	January 20, 2025 – present

== 1800s ==
- 1836: Specie Circular – Required payment for public lands be in gold and silver specie, repealed in 1838
- 1863: Proclamation of Amnesty and Reconstruction – Laid out President Abraham Lincoln's preliminary "10% plan" for reintegrating the "states in rebellion" back into the Union
- 1872: Colville Indian Reservation is created

=== Earliest numbered executive orders ===
The current numbering system for executive orders was established by the U.S. State Department in 1907, when all of the orders in the department's archives were assigned chronological numbers. The first executive order to be assigned a number was Executive Order 1, signed by Abraham Lincoln in 1862, but hundreds of unnumbered orders had been signed by presidents going back to George Washington.

President	Term	First	Last	Total
Abraham Lincoln	1861–1865	1	2	3
Andrew Johnson	1865–1869	3	7	5
Ulysses S. Grant	1869–1877	8	20	15
Rutherford B. Hayes	1877–1881	None	None	0
Chester A. Arthur	1881–1885	21	23	3

== Grover Cleveland (1885–1889, 1893–1897) ==
Works by or about Grover Cleveland's Executive Orders at Wikisource

=== First presidency (1885–1889) ===
Year	First	Last	Total
1885	23-1	24	2
1886	25	25	1
1887	26	27-1	3
1888	None	None	0
1889	None	None	0
Total	23-1	27-1	6

=== Second presidency (1893–1897) ===
Year	First	Last	Total
1893	30	31	3
1894	32	56	25
1895	57	84	29
1896	85	93	9
1897	94	96	3
Total	30	96	69

== Benjamin Harrison (1889–1893) ==
Works by or about Benjamin Harrison's Executive Orders at Wikisource

Year	First	Last	Total
1889	None	None	0
1890	28	28	1
1891	28-1	28-1	1
1892	28-A	28-A	1
1893	29	29	1
Total	28	29	4

== William McKinley (1897–1901) ==
Works by or about William McKinley's Executive Orders at Wikisource

Year	First	Last	Total
1897	97	103	7
1898	104	110	10
1899	111	122	12
1900	123	134	17
1901	135	140	6
Total	97	140	52

== Theodore Roosevelt (1901–1909) ==
Works by or about Theodore Roosevelt's Executive Orders at Wikisource

- 1901–1909: List of executive actions by Theodore Roosevelt: Complete list of executive orders by President Theodore Roosevelt

Year	First	Last	Total
1901	141	153	13
1902	154	196	44
1903	197	242	47
1904	243	288	47
1905	289	389	172
1906	389-A	542	165
1907	543	723	188
1908	724	1000	279
1909	1001	1050	50
Total	141	1050	1005

== William Howard Taft (1909–1913) ==
Works by or about William Howard Taft's Executive Orders at Wikisource

Year	First	Last	Total
1909	1051	1150	100
1910	1151	1277	129
1911	1278	1451	175
1912	1452	1673	221
1913	1674	1743	71
Total	1051	1743	696

== Woodrow Wilson (1913–1921) ==
Works by or about Woodrow Wilson's Executive Orders at Wikisource

- 1914: Executive Order 1888: Providing conditions of employment for the Permanent Force for the Panama Canal
- 1918: Executive Order 2859: National Research Council of the National Academy of Sciences

Year	First	Last	Total
1913	1744	1875	136
1914	1876	2113	243
1915	2114	2294	188
1916	2295	2502	212
1917	2503	2778	296
1918	2779	3019-B	260
1919	3020	3207	224
1920	3208	3380	174
1921	3381	3415	34
Total	1744	3415	1,767

== Warren G. Harding (1921–1923) ==
Works by or about Warren G. Harding's Executive Orders at Wikisource

Year	First	Last	Total
1921	3416	3604-A	191
1922	3605	3770-A	173
1923	3771	3885	118
Total	3416	3885	482

== Calvin Coolidge (1923–1929) ==
Works by or about Calvin Coolidge's Executive Orders at Wikisource

- 1927: Executive Order 4601: Authorization of the Distinguished Flying Cross

Year	First	Last	Total
1923	3885-A	3940	62
1924	3941	4119	189
1925	4120	4363-A	227
1926	4364	4559	202
1927	4560	4791	240
1928	4792	5018	290
1929	5019	5075	57
Total	3885-A	5075	1,267

== Herbert Hoover (1929–1933) ==
Year	First	Last	Total
1929	5076	5255	183
1930	5256	5523	268
1931	5524	5770	249
1932	5771	5984	215
1933	5985	6070	88
Total	5076	6070	1,003

== Franklin D. Roosevelt (1933–1945) ==
Administration of Franklin D. Roosevelt Executive Orders Disposition Tables

Year	First	Last	Total
1933	6071	6544	569
1934	6545	6935-A	473
1935	6936	7261-A	384
1936	7262	7531	275
1937	7532	7784	257
1938	7784-A	8030	249
1939	8031	8316	287
1940	8317	8624	310
1941	8625	9005	382
1942	9006	9292	290
1943	9293	9412	122
1944	9413	9508	100
1945	9509	9537	29
Total	6071	9537	3727

== Harry S. Truman (1945–1953) ==
Administration of Harry S Truman Executive Orders Disposition Tables

Year	First	Last	Total
1945	9538	9672	139
1946	9673	9817	148
1947	9818	9918	100
1948	9919	10025	117
1949	10026	10094	69
1950	10095	10199	95
1951	10200	10317	118
1952	10318	10420	104
1953	10421	10431	11
Total	9538	10431	907

== Dwight D. Eisenhower (1953–1961) ==
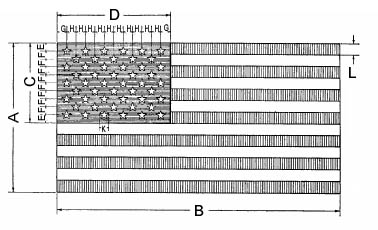
U.S. flag design as defined by Executive Order 10834

Administration of Dwight D. Eisenhower Executive Orders Disposition Tables

EOs 10432–10913

- 1953: Executive Order 10450: Charged the heads of federal agencies and the Office of Personnel Management, supported by the Federal Bureau of Investigation (FBI), with investigating federal employees to determine whether they posed security risks
- 1954: Executive Order 10555: Establishing a Seal for the President's Committee on Employment of the Physically Handicapped
- 1959: Executive Order 10834: Defined the design of the flag of the United States

Year	First	Last	Total
1953	10432	10511	80
1954	10512	10584	75
1955	10585	10649	66
1956	10650	10693	44
1957	10694	10747	55
1958	10748	10797	50
1959	10798	10857	60
1960	10858	10899	42
1961	10900	10913	14
Total	10432	10913	484

== John F. Kennedy (1961–1963) ==
Establishment of the Peace Corps
John F. Kennedy's announcement of the establishment of the Peace Corps

Administration of John F. Kennedy Executive Orders Disposition Tables

- 1961: Executive Order 10924: Established the Peace Corps
- 1961: Executive Order 10925: Required government contractors to "take affirmative action" to ensure non-discriminatory employment practices. Created the Equal Employment Opportunity Commission
- 1962: Executive Order 10988: Recognizes the right of federal workers to join employee organizations and bargain collectively
- 1962: Executive Order 10990: Reestablished the Federal Safety Council
- 1962: Executive Order 11051: Specifies the duties and responsibilities of the Office of Emergency Planning and gives authorization to put all executive orders into effect in times deemed to be of increased international tension, economic crisis, and/or financial crisis. Revoked by Executive Order 12148
- 1963: Executive Order 11110: Delegating the authority to issue silver certificates under the Agricultural Adjustment Act of May 12, 1933 to the Secretary of the Treasury
- 1963: Executive Order 11111: Federalized the Alabama National Guard in response to the Stand in the Schoolhouse Door

Year	First	Last	Total
1961	10914	10983	70
1962	10984	11072	89
1963	11073	11127	55
Total	10914	11127	214

== Lyndon B. Johnson (1963–1969) ==
Administration of Lyndon B. Johnson Executive Orders Disposition Tables

EOs 11128–11451

- 1963: Executive Order 11129: Decreed on November 29, 1963 that the NASA Launch Operations Center (LOC), including facilities on Merritt Island and Cape Canaveral, would be renamed the John F. Kennedy Space Center, NASA. That name change officially took effect on December 20, 1963
- 1963: Executive Order 11130: Created the Warren Commission to investigate the assassination of President John F. Kennedy
- 1964: Executive Order 11141: Declaring a public policy against discriminating on the basis of age
- 1965: Executive Order 11246: Prohibited discrimination in employment decisions on the basis of race, color, religion, sex, or national origin; rescinded during President Trump's second term.
- 1966: Executive Order 11310: Assigned Emergency Preparedness Functions to the Attorney General

Year	First	Last	Total
1963	11128	11134	7
1964	11135	11190	56
1965	11191	11264	74
1966	11265	11321	58
1967	11322	11386	65
1968	11387	11442	56
1969	11443	11451	9
Total	11128	11451	325

== Richard Nixon (1969–1974) ==
Administration of Richard Nixon Executive Orders Disposition Tables

EOs 11452–11797

- 1969: Executive Order 11478: Prohibiting discrimination based on race, color, religion, sex, national origin, handicap, or age in the competitive service of the federal civilian workforce, which includes civilians employed by the armed forces and by federal contractors and contractors performing under federally assisted construction contracts. Some categories were added by Executive Order 13087 in 1998 and Executive Order 13152 in 2000.

Year	First	Last	Total
1969	11452	11503	52
1970	11504	11575	72
1971	11576	11638	63
1972	11639	11693	55
1973	11694	11757	64
1974	11758	11797	39
Total	11452	11797	346

== Gerald R. Ford (1974–1977) ==
EOs 11798–11966

- 1975: Executive Order 11850: Renunciation of certain uses in war of chemical herbicides and riot control agents
- 1976: Executive Order 11905: Outlawed the use of political assassination
- 1976: Executive Order 11921: Allows the Federal Emergency Preparedness Agency to develop plans to establish control over the mechanisms of production, distribution, energy sources, wages, salaries, credit, and the flow of money

Year	First	Last	Total
1974	11798	11826	29
1975	11827	11893	67
1976	11894	11949	56
1977	11950	11966	17
Total	11798	11966	169

== Jimmy Carter (1977–1981) ==
Administration of Jimmy Carter Executive Orders Disposition Tables

EOs 11967–12286

- 1977: Executive Order 11967: Implemented Proclamation 4483, pardoning draft evaders of the Vietnam War
- 1978: Executive Order 12036: Reformed the U.S. Intelligence Community and further banned assassination
- 1979: Executive Order 12148: Established the Federal Emergency Management Agency (FEMA)
- 1979: Executive Order 12170: Allows the freezing of all Iranian assets held within the United States
- 1979: Executive Order 12172: Iranian aliens delegation of entry into the United States

Year	First	Last	Total
1977	11967	12032	66
1978	12033	12110	78
1979	12111	12187	77
1980	12188	12260	73
1981	12261	12286	26
Total	11967	12286	320

== Ronald Reagan (1981–1989) ==
Administration of Ronald Reagan Executive Orders Disposition Tables

- 1981: Executive Order 12333: Strengthened management of the U.S. Intelligence Community
- 1982: Executive Order 12372: Intergovernmental Review of federal programs
- 1986: Executive Order 12564: Drug-Free Federal Workplace
- 1987: Executive Order 12601: President's Commission on the HIV Epidemic
- 1988: Executive Order 12656: Assignment of Emergency Preparedness Responsibilities
- 1988: Executive Order 12631: Working Group on Financial Markets
- 1989: Executive Order 12667: Establishes procedure for access to Presidential Records (Revoked by Executive Order 13233, November 1, 2001. Restored by Executive Order on January 21, 2009)

Year	First	Last	Total
1981	12287	12336	50
1982	12337	12399	63
1983	12400	12456	57
1984	12457	12497	41
1985	12498	12542	45
1986	12543	12579	37
1987	12580	12622	43
1988	12623	12662	40
1989	12663	12667	5
Total	12287	12667	381

== George H. W. Bush (1989–1993) ==
Administration of George Bush Executive Orders Disposition Tables

Year	First	Last	Total
1989	12668	12698	31
1990	12699	12741	43
1991	12742	12787	46
1992	12788	12827	40
1993	12828	12833	6
Total	12668	12833	166

== Bill Clinton (1993–2001) ==
Administration of William J. Clinton Executive Orders Disposition Tables

Year	First	Last	Total
1993	12834	12890	57
1994	12891	12944	54
1995	12945	12984	40
1996	12985	13033	49
1997	13034	13071	38
1998	13072	13109	38
1999	13110	13144	35
2000	13145	13185	41
2001	13186	13197	12
Total	12834	13197	364

== George W. Bush (2001–2009) ==
Administration of George W. Bush Executive Orders Disposition Tables

Year	First	Last	Total
2001	13198	13249	52
2002	13250	13282	33
2003	13283	13323	41
2004	13324	13368	45
2005	13369	13394	26
2006	13395	13421	27
2007	13422	13453	32
2008	13454	13483	30
2009	13484	13488	5
Total	13198	13488	291

== Barack Obama (2009–2017) ==
Administration of Barack Obama Executive Orders Disposition Tables

Year	First	Last	Total
2009	13489	13527	39
2010	13528	13562	35
2011	13563	13596	34
2012	13597	13635	39
2013	13636	13655	20
2014	13656	13686	31
2015	13687	13715	29
2016	13716	13757	42
2017	13758	13764	7
Total	13489	13764	276

== Donald Trump (2017–2021, 2025–present) ==
=== First presidency (2017–2021) ===
Year	First	Last	Total
2017	13765	13819	55
2018	13820	13856	37
2019	13857	13901	45
2020	13902	13969	68
2021	13970	13984	15
Total	13765	13984	220

=== Second presidency (2025–present) ===
Year	First	Last	Total
2025	14147	14371	225
Total	14372	—N/a	—N/a

== Joe Biden (2021–2025) ==
Year	First	Last	Total
2021	13985	14061	77
2022	14062	14090	29
2023	14091	14114	24
2024	14115	14133	19
2025	14134	14146	13
Total	13985	14146	162

== See also ==
- List of sources of law in the United States
- List of United States federal legislation
- Presidential directive
