= Executive order (United States) =

Federal administrative instruction issued by the U.S. president

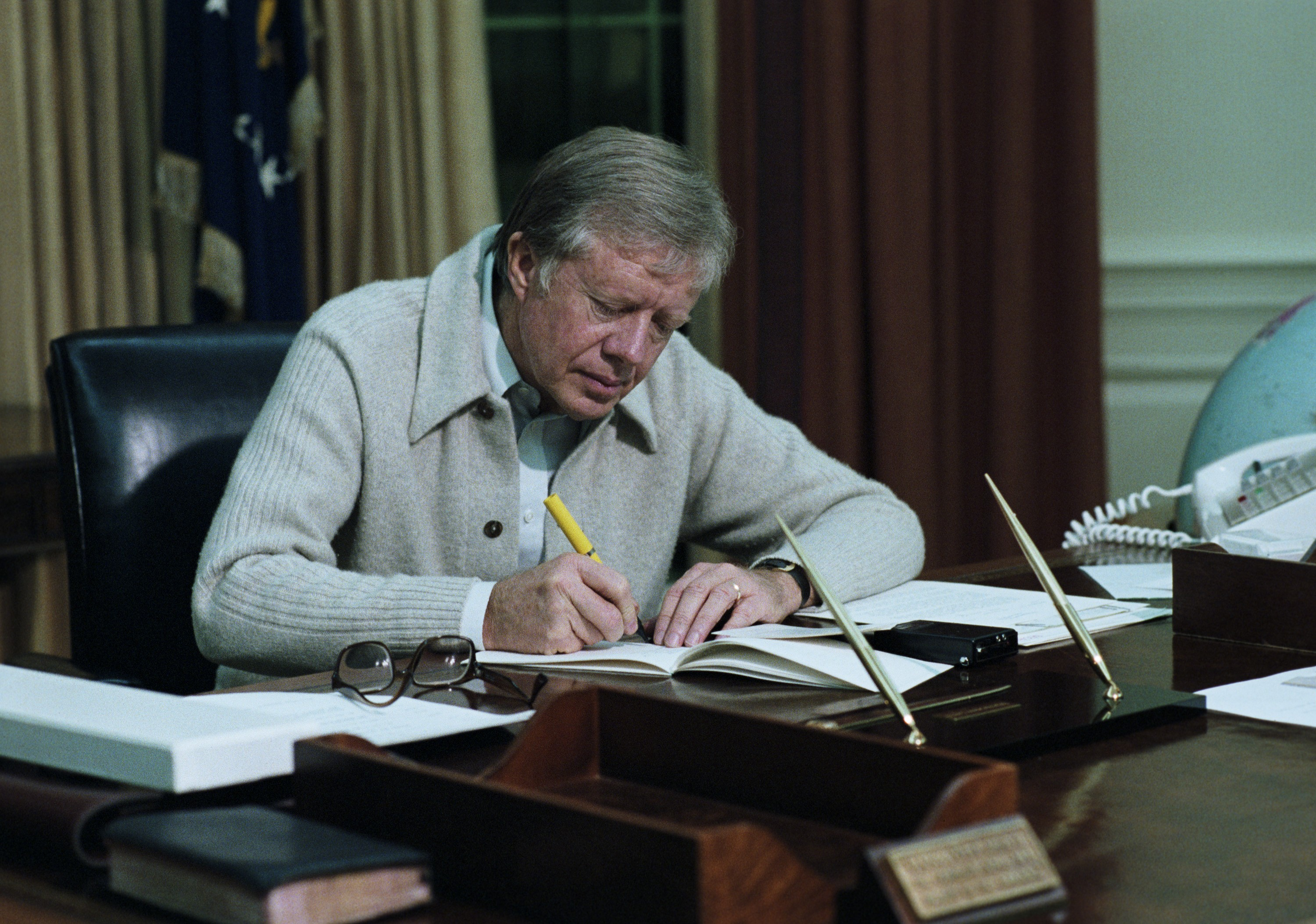
U.S. president Jimmy Carter signing an executive order on his last day as president on January 20, 1981

An executive order is a directive by the president of the United States that manages operations of the federal government. Executive orders are only binding on the federal government's executive branch. The legal or constitutional basis for executive orders has multiple sources. Article Two of the United States Constitution gives presidents broad executive and enforcement authority to use their discretion to determine how to enforce the law or to otherwise manage the resources and staff of the federal government's executive branch. The delegation of discretionary power to make such orders is required to be supported by either an expressed or implied congressional law, or the constitution itself. The vast majority of executive orders are proposed by federal agencies before being issued by the president.

Like both legislative statutes and the regulations promulgated by government agencies, executive orders in the United States are subject to judicial review and may be overturned if the orders lack support by statute or the Constitution. Some policy initiatives require approval by the legislative branch, but executive orders have significant influence over the internal affairs of government, deciding how and to what degree legislation will be enforced, dealing with emergencies, waging wars, and in general fine-tuning policy choices in the implementation of broad statutes. As the head of state and head of government of the United States, as well as commander-in-chief of the United States Armed Forces, only the president of the United States can issue an executive order.

Presidential executive orders, once issued, remain in force until they are canceled, revoked, adjudicated unlawful, or expire on their terms. At any time, the president may revoke, modify or make exceptions from any executive order, whether the order was made by the current president or a predecessor. Typically, a new president reviews in-force executive orders in the first few weeks in office.

== Basis in the United States Constitution ==
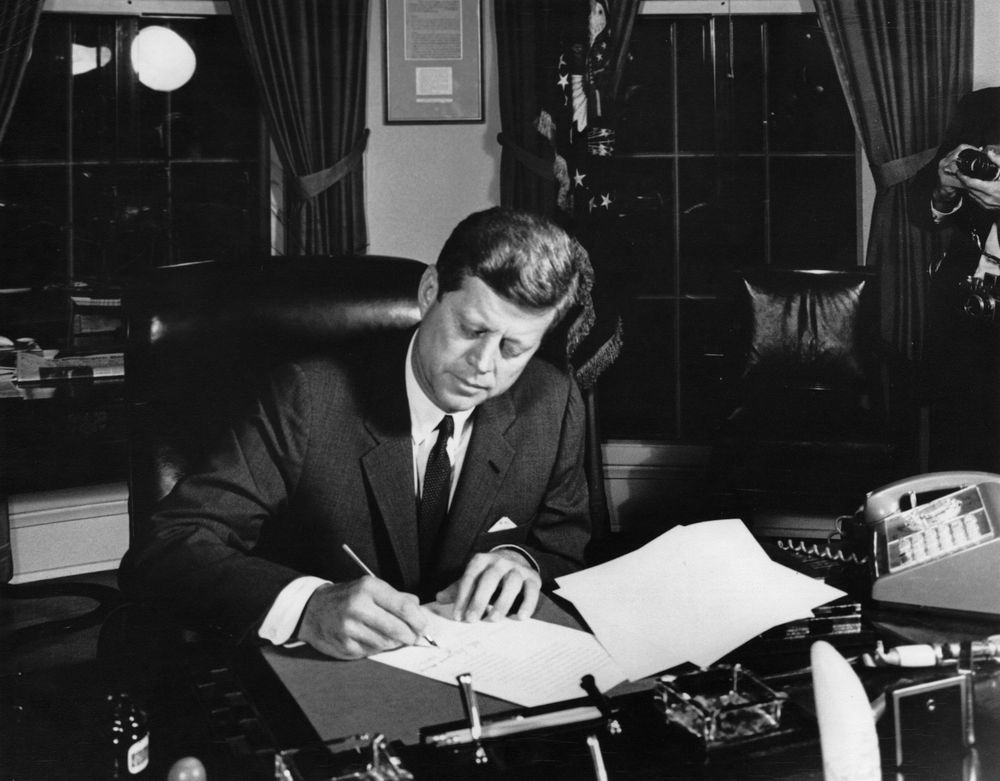
President John F. Kennedy signing a proclamation 3504 authorizing the naval quarantine of Cuba on October 23, 1962

The United States Constitution does not have a provision that explicitly permits the use of executive orders. Article II, Section 1, Clause 1 of the Constitution simply states: "The executive Power shall be vested in a President of the United States of America." Sections 2 and 3 describe the various powers and duties of the president, including "He shall take care that the Laws be faithfully executed".

The U.S. Supreme Court has held that all executive orders from the president of the United States must be supported by the Constitution, whether from a clause granting specific power, or by Congress delegating such to the executive branch. Specifically, such orders must be rooted in Article II of the US Constitution or enacted by the Congress in statutes. Attempts to block such orders have been successful at times, when such orders either exceeded the authority of the president or could be better handled through legislation.

The Office of the Federal Register is responsible for assigning the executive order a sequential number, after receipt of the signed original from the White House and printing the text of the executive order in the daily Federal Register and eventually in Title 3 of the Code of Federal Regulations.

== Format ==
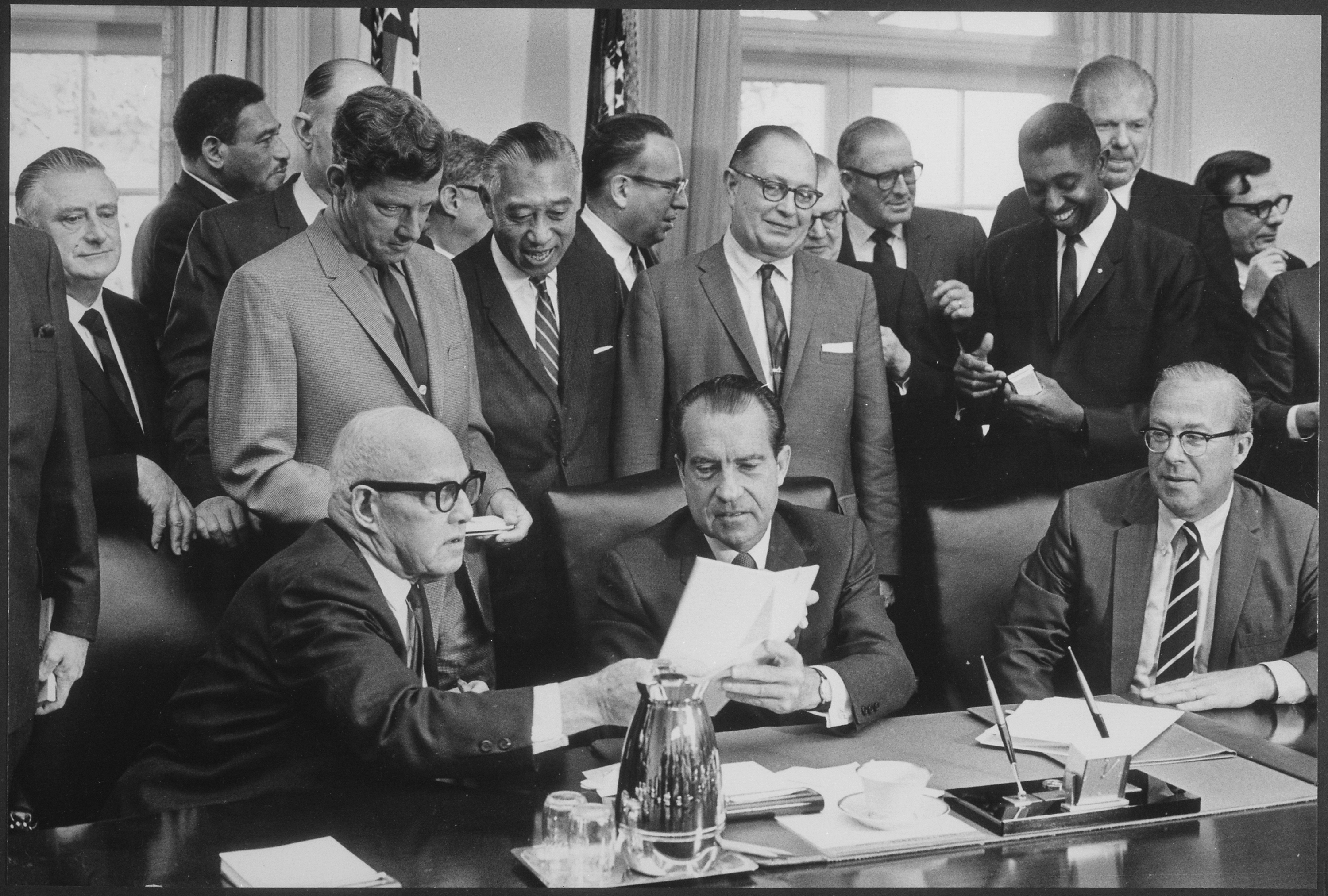
President Richard Nixon signing an executive order establishing the institutional framework for labor-management relations within the federal government on October 29, 1969

In the United States, executive orders are generally written in the first person, including pronouns such as "I" and "me". Each order has a title, a date of issue, and a unique numeric identifier, with orders being numbered consecutively. These three elements usually appear at the beginning of the document, although the date or numeric identifier sometimes appear at the end of historical documents. The introductory text of the order usually starts with a phrase indicating the issuer's authority. For example: "By the authority vested in me as President by the Constitution and the laws of the United States of America, it is hereby ordered [...]" Sometimes the introduction will be longer, and may include the issuer's legal rationale for the order.

The body of the document is generally broken into numbered or lettered sections and subsections. According to the American Bar Association, "[sections] spell out the orders, action steps to realize the orders, and other directives, such as study or evaluation, and subsections add additional details, including any relevant definitions." The last section of an order is usually administrative, including a directive to publish the order in the Federal Register.

== History and use ==
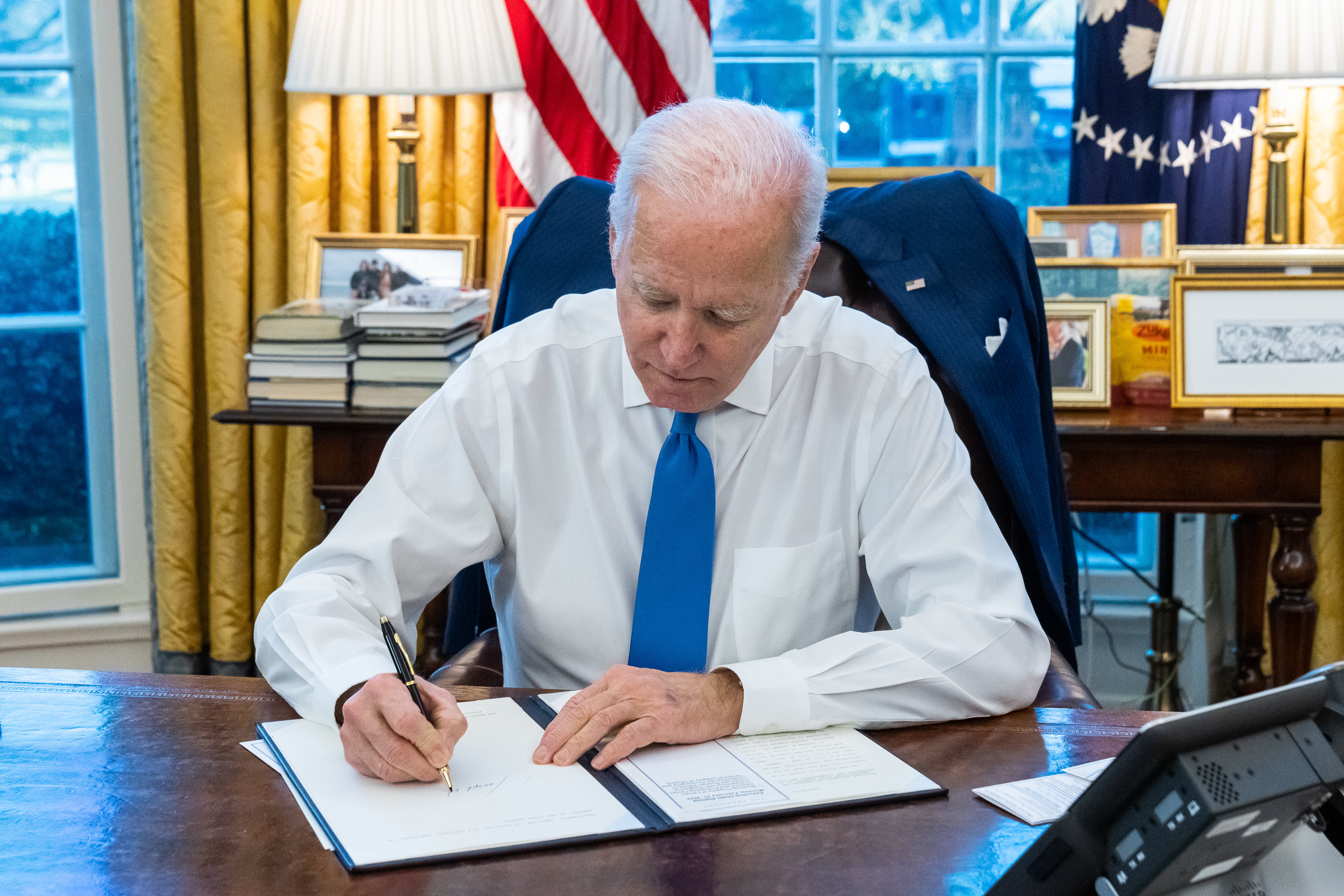
President Joe Biden signing an executive order in response to Russia's imminent invasion of Ukraine in February 2022

With the exception of William Henry Harrison, all presidents since George Washington in 1789 have issued orders that in general terms can be described as executive orders. Initially, they took no set form and so they varied as to form and substance.

The first executive order was issued by Washington on June 8, 1789; addressed to the heads of the federal departments, it instructed them "to impress [him] with a full, precise, and distinct general idea of the affairs of the United States" in their fields.

According to political scientist Brian R. Dirck, the most famous executive order was by President Abraham Lincoln when he issued the Emancipation Proclamation on September 22, 1862, which in part contained explicit directions to the Army, the Navy, and other Executive departments:

The Emancipation Proclamation was an executive order, itself a rather unusual thing in those days. Executive orders are simply presidential directives issued to agents of the executive department by its boss.

Until the early 1900s, executive orders were mostly unannounced and undocumented, and seen only by the agencies to which they were directed.

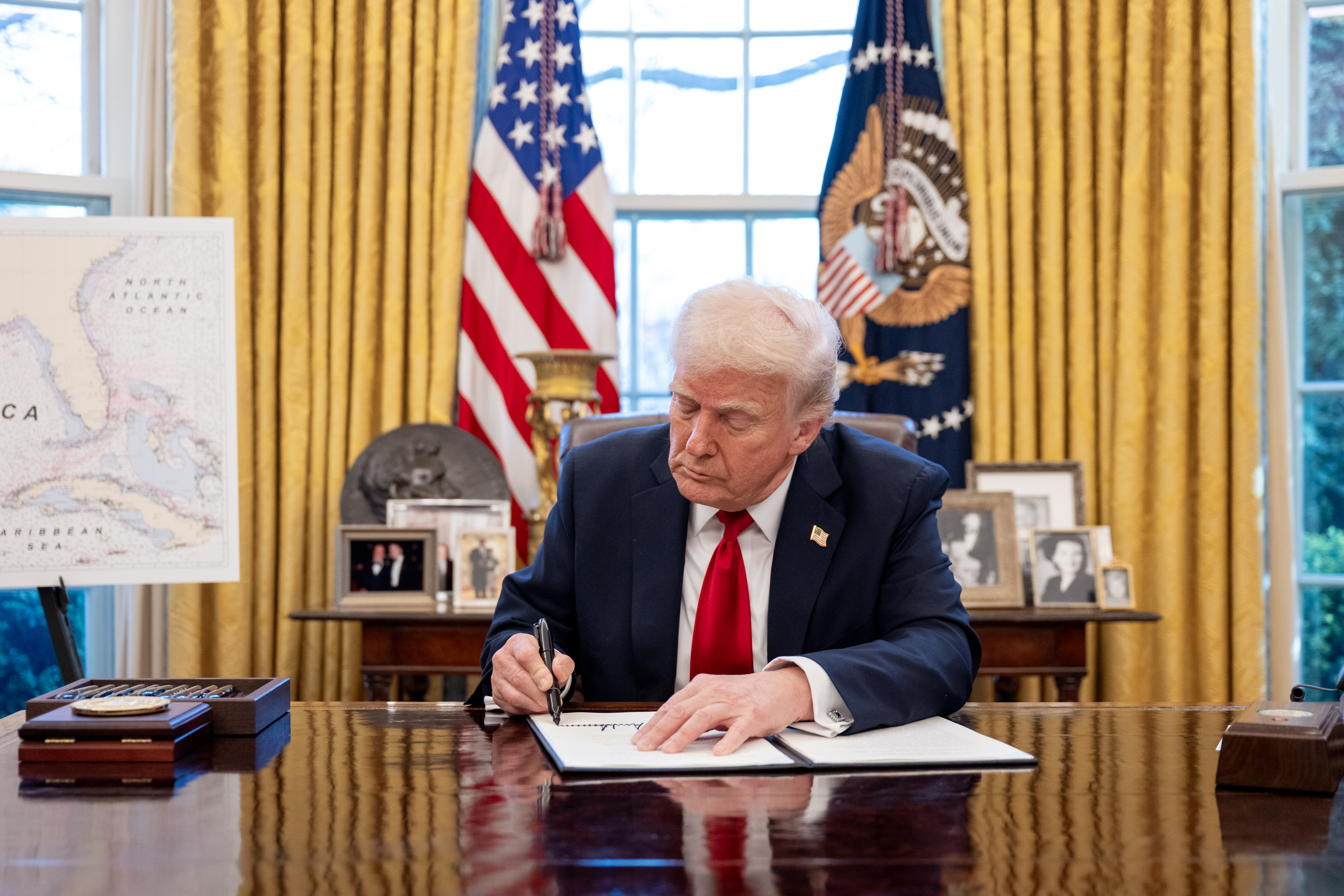
President Donald Trump signing an executive order imposing tariffs on auto imports on March 26, 2025

That changed when the US Department of State instituted a numbering scheme in 1907, starting retroactively with United States Executive Order 1, issued on October 20, 1862, by President Lincoln. The documents that later came to be known as "executive orders" apparently gained their name from that order issued by Lincoln, which was captioned "Executive Order Establishing a Provisional Court in Louisiana". That court functioned during the military occupation of Louisiana during the American Civil War, and Lincoln also used Executive Order 1 to appoint Charles A. Peabody as judge and designate the salaries of the court's officers.

President Harry Truman's Executive Order 10340 placed all the country's steel mills under federal control, which was found invalid in Youngstown Sheet & Tube Co. v. Sawyer, 343 US 579 (1952), because it attempted to make law, rather than to clarify or to further a law put forth by the Congress or the Constitution. Presidents since that decision have generally been careful to cite the specific laws under which they act when they issue new executive orders; likewise, when presidents believe that their authority for issuing an executive order stems from within the powers outlined in the Constitution, the order instead simply proclaims "under the authority vested in me by the Constitution".

Wars have been fought upon executive order, including the 1999 Kosovo War during President Bill Clinton's second term in office; however, all such wars have also had authorizing resolutions from Congress. The extent to which the president may exercise military power independently of Congress and the scope of the War Powers Resolution remain unresolved constitutional issues, but all presidents since the passage of the resolution have complied with its terms, while also maintaining that they are not constitutionally required to do so.

Harry S. Truman issued 907 executive orders, with 1,081 orders made by Theodore Roosevelt, 1,203 orders made by Calvin Coolidge, and 1,803 orders made by Woodrow Wilson. Franklin D. Roosevelt has the distinction of making a record 3,721 executive orders.

In 2021, President Joe Biden issued 42 executive orders in the first 100 days of his presidency, more than any other president since Harry Truman. However, in 2025, Donald Trump became the president to issue the most executive orders in his first 100 days with 143, surpassing Franklin Roosevelt's 99.

=== Franklin Roosevelt ===
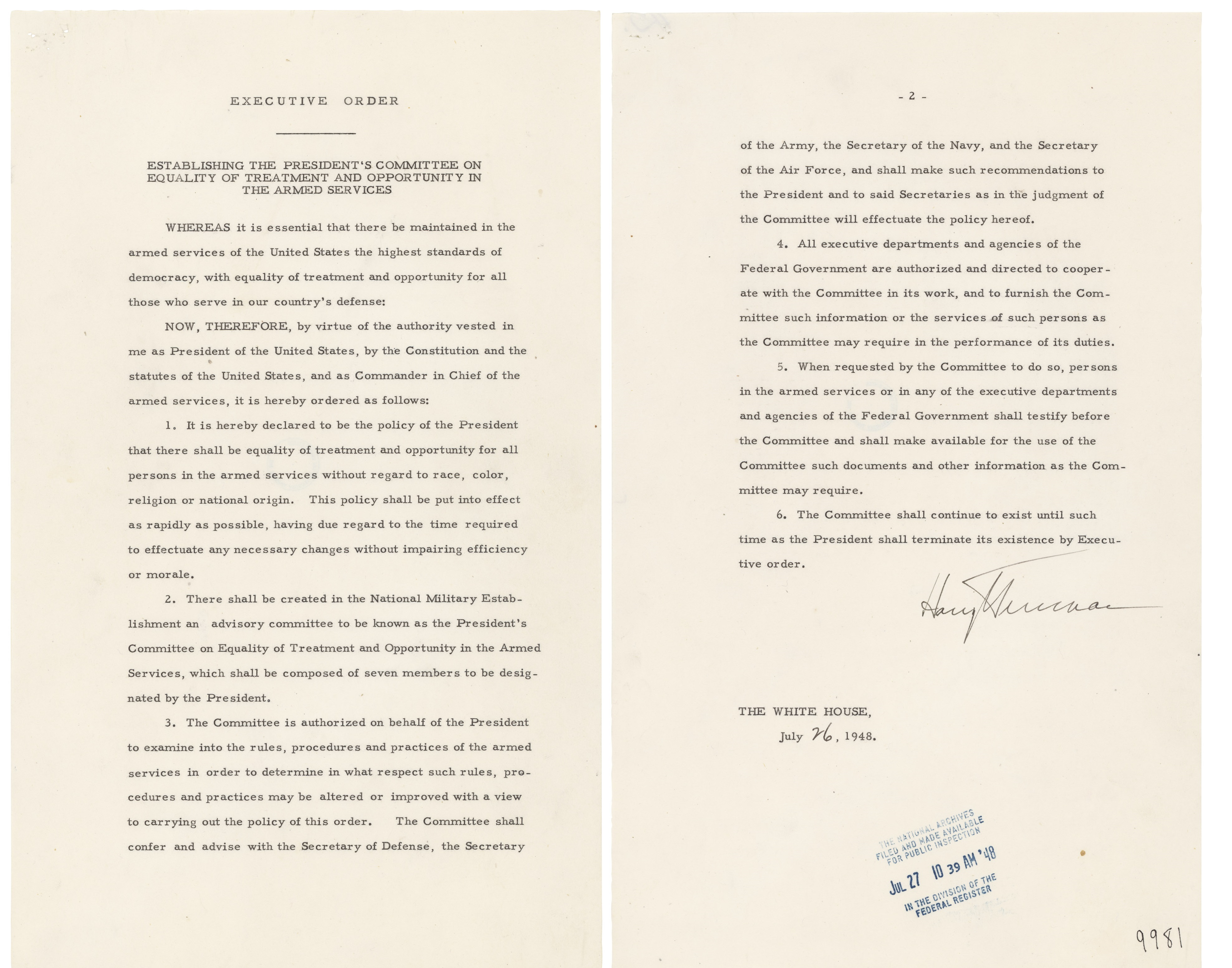
US Executive Order 9981 (1948) which led to the re-integration of the armed services

Before 1932, uncontested executive orders had determined such issues as national mourning on the death of a president and the lowering of flags to half-staff.

President Franklin Roosevelt issued the first of his 3,721 executive orders on March 6, 1933, declaring a bank holiday, and forbidding banks to release gold coin or bullion. Executive Order 6102 forbade the hoarding of gold coin, bullion and gold certificates. A further executive order required all newly mined domestic gold be delivered to the Treasury.

By Executive Order 6581, the president created the Export-Import Bank of the United States. On March 7, 1934, he established the National Recovery Review Board (Executive Order 6632). On June 29, the president issued Executive Order 6763 "under the authority vested in me by the Constitution", thereby creating the National Labor Relations Board.

In 1934, while Charles Evans Hughes was Chief Justice of the United States (the period being known as the Hughes Court), the Court found that the National Industrial Recovery Act (NIRA) was unconstitutional. The president then issued Executive Order 7073 "by virtue of the authority vested in me under the said Emergency Relief Appropriation Act of 1935", re-establishing the National Emergency Council to administer the functions of the NIRA in carrying out the provisions of the Emergency Relief Appropriations Act. On June 15, he issued Executive Order 7075, which terminated the NIRA and replaced it with the Office of Administration of the National Recovery Administration.

In the years that followed, Roosevelt replaced outgoing justices of the Supreme Court with people more in line with his views: Hugo Black, Stanley Reed, Felix Frankfurter, William O. Douglas, Frank Murphy, Robert H. Jackson and James F. Byrnes. Historically, only George Washington has had equal or greater influence over Supreme Court appointments (as he chose all its original members).

Justices Frankfurter, Douglas, Black, and Jackson dramatically checked presidential power by invalidating the executive order at issue in Youngstown Sheet & Tube Co. v. Sawyer: in that case Roosevelt's successor, Harry S. Truman, had ordered private steel production facilities seized in Executive Order 10340 to support the Korean War effort: the Court held that the executive order was not within the power granted to the president by the Constitution.

== Table of U.S. presidents using executive orders ==
| President | Number issued | Starting with EO no. |
|---|---|---|
| George Washington (two terms) | 8 | —N/a |
| John Adams (one term) | 1 | —N/a |
| Thomas Jefferson (two terms) | 4 | —N/a |
| James Madison (two terms) | 1 | —N/a |
| James Monroe (two terms) | 1 | —N/a |
| John Quincy Adams (one term) | 3 | —N/a |
| Andrew Jackson (two terms) | 12 | —N/a |
| Martin Van Buren (one term) | 10 | —N/a |
| William Henry Harrison (one month as president) | 0 | —N/a |
| John Tyler (one partial term of nearly full length) | 17 | —N/a |
| James K. Polk (one term) | 18 | —N/a |
| Zachary Taylor (one partial term of one year and four months) | 5 | —N/a |
| Millard Fillmore (one partial term of two years and eight months) | 12 | —N/a |
| Franklin Pierce (one term) | 35 | —N/a |
| James Buchanan (one term) | 16 | —N/a |
| Abraham Lincoln (one term and one month of a second term) | 48 | 1 |
| Andrew Johnson (one partial term of nearly full length) | 79 | 3 |
| Ulysses S. Grant (two terms) | 217 | 8 |
| Rutherford B. Hayes (one term) | 92 | —N/a |
| James A. Garfield (one partial term) | 6 | —N/a |
| Chester A. Arthur (one partial term) | 96 | 21 |
| Grover Cleveland (first term) | 113 | 24 |
| Benjamin Harrison (one term) | 143 | 28 |
| Grover Cleveland (second term) | 140 | 30 |
| William McKinley (one term and six months of a second term) | 185 | 97 |
| Theodore Roosevelt (one partial term of three and a half years and one full term) | 1,081 | 141 |
| William Howard Taft (one term) | 724 | 1051 |
| Woodrow Wilson (two terms) | 1,803 | 1744 |
| Warren G. Harding (one partial term of a year and a half) | 522 | 3416 |
| Calvin Coolidge (one partial term of two and a half years and one full term) | 1,203 | 3886 |
| Herbert Hoover (one term) | 968 | 5075 |
| Franklin D. Roosevelt (three terms and two months of a fourth) | 3,721 | 6071 |
| Harry S. Truman (one partial term of nearly full length and one full term) | 907 | 9538 |
| Dwight D. Eisenhower (two terms) | 484 | 10432 |
| John F. Kennedy (one partial term of two years and nine months) | 214 | 10914 |
| Lyndon B. Johnson (one partial term of two years and three months and one full term) | 325 | 11128 |
| Richard Nixon (one term and part of another) | 346 | 11452 |
| Gerald R. Ford (one partial term) | 169 | 11798 |
| Jimmy Carter (one term) | 320 | 11967 |
| Ronald Reagan (two terms) | 381 | 12287 |
| George H. W. Bush (one term) | 166 | 12668 |
| Bill Clinton (two terms) | 364 | 12834 |
| George W. Bush (two terms) | 291 | 13198 |
| Barack Obama (two terms) | 276 | 13489 |
| Donald Trump (first term) | 220 | 13765 |
| Joe Biden (one term) | 162 | 13985 |
| Donald Trump (second term) (incumbent) | 290 | 14147 |

== Reaction ==
Large policy changes with wide-ranging effects have been implemented by executive order, including the racial integration of the armed forces under President Truman.

Two extreme examples of an executive order are Franklin Roosevelt's Executive Order 6102 "forbidding the hoarding of gold coin, gold bullion, and gold certificates within the continental United States", and Executive Order 9066, which delegated military authority to remove any or all people in a military zone (used to target Japanese Americans, non-citizen Germans, and non-citizen Italians in certain regions). The order was then delegated to General John L. DeWitt, and it subsequently paved the way for all Japanese-Americans on the West Coast to be incarcerated in ten specially built prison camps for the duration of World War II.

President George W. Bush issued Executive Order 13233 in 2001, which restricted public access to the papers of former presidents. The order was criticized by the Society of American Archivists and other groups, who say it "violates both the spirit and letter of existing U.S. law on access to presidential papers as clearly laid down in 44 USC 2201–07", and adding that the order "potentially threatens to undermine one of the very foundations of our nation". President Barack Obama subsequently revoked Executive Order 13233 in January 2009.

=== Legal conflicts ===
In 1935, the Supreme Court overturned five of Franklin Roosevelt's executive orders (6199, 6204, 6256, 6284a and 6855).

Executive Order 12954, issued by President Bill Clinton in 1995, attempted to prevent the federal government from contracting with organizations that had strike-breakers on the payroll: a federal appeals court ruled that the order conflicted with the National Labor Relations Act and overturned the order.

Congress has the power to overturn an executive order by passing legislation that invalidates it, and can also refuse to provide funding necessary to carry out certain policy measures contained with the order or legitimize policy mechanisms.

In the case of the former, the president retains the power to veto such a decision; however, Congress may override a veto with a two-thirds majority to end an executive order. It has been argued that a congressional override of an executive order is a nearly impossible event, because of the supermajority vote required, and the fact that such a vote leaves individual lawmakers vulnerable to political criticism.

On July 30, 2014, the US House of Representatives approved a resolution authorizing Speaker of the House John Boehner to sue President Obama over claims that he exceeded his executive authority in changing a key provision of the Affordable Care Act ("Obamacare") on his own and over what Republicans claimed had been "inadequate enforcement of the health care law", which Republican lawmakers opposed. In particular, Republicans "objected that the Obama administration delayed some parts of the law, particularly the mandate on employers who do not provide health care coverage". The suit was filed in the US District Court for the District of Columbia on November 21, 2014.

Part of President Donald Trump's executive order Protecting the Nation from Foreign Terrorist Entry into the United States, which temporarily banned entry to the US of citizens of seven Muslim-majority countries, including for permanent residents, was stayed by a federal court on January 28, 2017. However, on June 26, 2018, the US Supreme Court overturned the lower court order in Trump v. Hawaii and affirmed that the executive order was within the president's constitutional authority.

The degree to which the president has the power to use executive orders to set policy for independent federal agencies is disputed. Many orders specifically exempt independent agencies, but some do not. Executive Order 12866 has been a particular matter of controversy; it requires cost-benefit analysis for certain regulatory actions.

== Executive orders in U.S. states ==
Executive orders issued by state governors are not the same as statutes passed by state legislatures. State executive orders are usually based on existing constitutional or statutory powers of the governor and do not require any action by the state legislature to take effect.

Executive orders may, for example, demand budget cuts from state government when the state legislature is not in session, and economic conditions take a downturn, thereby decreasing tax revenue below what was forecast when the budget was approved. Depending on the state constitution, a governor may specify by what percentage each government agency must reduce and may exempt those that are already particularly underfunded or cannot put long-term expenses (such as capital expenditures) off until a later fiscal year. The governor may also call the legislature into special session.

There are also other uses for gubernatorial executive orders. In 2007, for example, Sonny Perdue, the governor of Georgia, issued an executive order for all its state agencies to reduce water use during a major drought. The same was demanded of its counties' water systems as well, but it was unclear whether the order would have the force of law.

== See also ==
- List of United States federal executive orders
- Military fiat
- Presidential determination
- Presidential directive
- Presidential memorandum
- Presidential proclamation
- Signing statement (United States)
