= Executive Action =

Executive Action may refer to:

== Media ==
- Executive Action, a 1973 fiction thriller by Donald Freed and Mark Lane
- Executive Action, a 1973 film based on the book of the same name

== Politics ==
- Executive action, a euphemism for political assassination
- Executive action, US presidential actions such as executive orders, presidential memoranda, etc.
- List of executive actions by Andrew Jackson
- List of lands protected by Theodore Roosevelt through executive action
- List of executive actions by John F. Kennedy
- List of executive actions by Richard Nixon
- List of executive actions by Ronald Reagan
- List of executive actions by Barack Obama
- List of executive actions by Joe Biden
- List of executive actions by Donald Trump
