= List of executive actions by Calvin Coolidge =

The president of the United States may take any of several kinds of executive actions.

Executive orders are issued to help officers and agencies of the executive branch manage the operations within the federal government itself. Presidential memoranda are closely related, and have the force of law on the Executive Branch, but are generally considered less prestigious. Presidential memoranda do not have an established process for issuance, and unlike executive orders, they are not numbered. A presidential determination results in an official policy or position of the executive branch of the United States government. A presidential proclamation is a statement issued by a president on a matter of public policy, under specific authority granted to the president by Congress, typically on a matter of widespread interest. Administrative orders are signed documents such as notices, letters, and orders, that can be issued to conduct administrative operations of the federal government. A presidential notice or a presidential sequestration order can also be issued.

Listed below are executive orders numbered 3885-A–5075 and presidential proclamations signed by United States President Calvin Coolidge (1923–1929). He issued 1203 executive orders. His executive orders are also listed on Wikisource, along with his presidential proclamations.

Signature of Calvin Coolidge

== Executive orders ==
=== 1923 ===
Relative No.	Absolute No.	Title/Description	Date signed
1	3885-A	Closing of Executive Departments in Connection With the Death of Warren G. Harding Approved	August 4, 1923
2	3885-B	Executive Departments Ordered Closed from 1 p.m. August 7 Through August 10 in Connection With the Death of Warren G. Harding	August 4, 1923
3	3885-C	Period of Mourning for Warren G. Harding Prescribed	August 4, 1923
4	3885-D	Executive Order 3885-B of August 4, 1923, Closing All Executive Departments in Connection With the Death of Warren G. Harding Made Applicable to All Executive Establishments	August 6, 1923
5	3886	Viola B. Pugh Designated to Sign the President's Name to Land Patents	August 4, 1923
6	3887	Ada Braddock Designated to Sign President's Name to Land Patents in Absence of Designated Clerk	August 4, 1923
7	3893		August 13, 1923
8	3893-A	David W. Davis Made Eligible for Appointment as Commissioner in the Reclamation Service Without Regard to Civil Service Rules	August 17, 1923
9	3897	Removing Lands from Katmai National Monument to End that Coal Mining Permit be Granted to John J. Folstad	September 5, 1923
10	3908-A	Civil Service Rule IX, Pertaining to Reinstatement, Amended	September 28, 1923
11	3917-A	Alien Property Custodian Authorized to Sell at Private Sale Certain Specified Stock of the Botany Worsted Mills of New Jersey	October 23, 1923
12	3940	James L. Wilmeth and James E. Chamberlin, Separated Formerly in the Engraving and Printing Bureau, Made Eligible to Reenter the Classified Service for Five Years on Certificate	December 24, 1923

=== 1924 ===
Relative No.	Absolute No.	Title/Description	Date signed
13	3941	Executive Order 9 of January 17, 1873, Prohibiting Federal Employees From Holding Office Under Any State, Territorial, County or Municipal Government, Waived to Permit C. C. Crabbe, Attorney General of Ohio, to Hold Position of Special Assistant to the Attorney General of the United States	January 11, 1924
14	3941-A	Harvey Entriken Made Eligible for Appointment as Private Secretary in the Office of the Board of General Appraisers in New York Without Regard to Civil Service Rules	January 15, 1924
15	3946	Removing Lands from Mt. McKinley National Park, and Reserving Those and Adjoining Lands for Construction and Operation of Railroad Lines	January 21, 1924
16	3949	Transferring Lands from the Department of the Interior to the Department of the Treasury	January 24, 1924
17	3971		March 12, 1924
18	3971-A	Certain Tax Returns Ordered Open to Inspection	March 15, 1924
19	3972		March 18, 1924
20	3976	Withdrawing Lands in Isle Royale, Michigan, to Determine Advisability for Inclusion in National Monument	March 22, 1924
21	3983	Withdrawing Lands in Alaska to Determine Advisability for Inclusion in National Monument	April 1, 1924
22	3984	Withdrawing Lands in New Mexico to Determine Advisability for Inclusion in National Park or Monument	April 2, 1924
23	3999	Withdrawing Lands in Arizona for Classification and Pending Legislation for its Disposition	April 25, 1924
24	3999-A	Theodore J. Risley, Labor Department Solicitor, Designated to Act as Secretary of Labor in the Absence of the Secretary, the Assistant and Second Assistant Secretaries	April 28, 1924
25	4008	Reducing Lands of the Scotts Bluff National Monument	May 9, 1924
26	4013		May 19, 1924
27	4033-A	Withdrawing Certain Described Lands in Arizona for Classification and Possible Inclusion Within the San Carlos Irrigation Project	June 24, 1924
28	4048		July 12, 1924
29	4056	Certain Described Lands in Alabama Withdrawn from Classification and Possible Inclusion Within the Alabama National Forest	August 1, 1924
30	4059		August 6, 1924
31	4071-A	Alien Property Custodian Authorized to Sell Certain Described Real Estate at New York, N. Y., Formerly the Property of John Otterstedt of Germany	September 5, 1924
32	4071-B	Alien Property Custodian Authorized to Sell Certain Specified Shares of Stock of the Botany Worsted Mills, Held in Trust for George Hirsch	September 8, 1924
33	4073-A	Alien Property Custodian Authorized to Sell Certain Described Real Estate in Cedar Rapids, Iowa, and Levy and Cook Counties, Florida, Formerly the Property of Carl and Friedrich Magnus of Germany	September 9, 1924
34	4102-A	Alien Property Custodian Authorized to Ratify Acts Done By His Subordinates Which Were Judicial in Character and Which Pertain to Deposits, Transfer and Payment of Moneys	November 13, 1924
35	4102-B	Certain Presidential Powers Authorized Under the Trading With the Enemy Act Delegated to the Alien Property Custodian	November 13, 1924
36	4106-A	Alien Property Custodian Authorized to Sell Certain Described Real Estate at San Francisco, California, Formerly the Property of Adolph, Friedrich, Ernst, Elizabeth, and Clara Nussbaum of Germany	November 24, 1924
37	4119	Effie A. Deane Made Eligible for Appointment in the Government Service Without Regard to Civil Service Rules	December 24, 1924

=== 1925 ===
Relative No.	Absolute No.	Title/Description	Date signed
38	4120	A. H. Bergthold Made Eligible for Appointment as Postmaster at Weatherford, Oklahoma, Without Examination	January 8, 1925
39	4124		January 12, 1925
40	4145		January 28, 1925
41	4146		February 2, 1925
42	4163		February 27, 1925
43	4164		March 6, 1925
44	4165		March 9, 1925
45	4165-A		March 9, 1925
46	4165-B		March 9, 1925
47	4165-C		March 9, 1925
48	4165-D		March 9, 1925
49	4165-E		March 9, 1925
50	4166		March 10, 1925
51	4167		March 10, 1925
52	4168		March 11, 1925
53	4169		March 12, 1925
54	4170		March 12, 1925
55	4170-A		March 12, 1925
56	4171		March 13, 1925
57	4172		March 13, 1925
58	4173		March 14, 1925
59	4174		March 16, 1925
60	4175		March 17, 1925
61	4176	Discontinuance and Transfer of 28 District Land Offices	March 17, 1925
62	4177		March 18, 1925
63	4178		March 19, 1925
64	4179		March 20, 1925
65	4179-A	Diminishment of Sugar Loaf or Kakea Military Reservation, Oahu, Territory of Hawaii, and Restoration of Excluded Lands to the Government of the Territory of Hawaii	March 20, 1925
66	4179-B		March 20, 1925
67	4179-C		March 20, 1925
68	4179-D		March 20, 1925
69	4179-E		March 20, 1925
70	4180		March 24, 1925
71	4181	Lands in Utah Withdrawn for Classification and Pending Legislation for Inclusion in Zion National Park	March 24, 1925
72	4186		March 31, 1925
73	4187	Fifty-One Posts Designated as Unhealthful Posts for the Purposes of Retirement of Personnel Under the Regulations for the Foreign Service	April 1, 1925
74	4200		April 10, 1925
75	4216		April 30, 1925
76	4217		May 2, 1925
77	4221		May 11, 1925
78	4224		May 14, 1925
79	4224-A	Executive Order 4073-A of September 9, 1924, Authorizing the Alien Property Custodian to Sell Certain Real Estate, Formerly the Property of Carl and Friedrich Magnus of Germany, Amended to Include Certain Described Property in Cook County, Illinois	May 14, 1925
80	4224½		May 15, 1925
81	4225		May 16, 1925
82	4235		May 27, 1925
83	4236		June 1, 1925
84	4239	The Bureau of Mines Was Transferred from the Department of Interior to the Department of Commerce	June 4, 1925
85	4250		June 10, 1925
86	4257		June 27, 1925
87	4258		July 1, 1925
88	4262	Withdrawing Certain Described Lands in Alabama, Florida and Mississippi Pending Classification	July 3, 1925
89	4274	Diminishment of Schofield Barracks Military Reservation, Oahu, Territory of Hawaii, and Restoration of Excluded Lands to the Government of the Territory of Hawaii for Use as a School Site	July 25, 1925
90	4274-A	Ordering Half-Mast Flag Display for the Funeral of William Jennings Bryan	July 27, 1925
91	4275		July 28, 1925
92	4276		July 28, 1925
93	4276-A		July 29, 1925
94	4277		July 30, 1925
95	4278		July 31, 1925
96	4279		August 6, 1925
97	4279-A		August 6, 1925
98	4280		August 7, 1925
99	4298		August 29, 1925
100	4299		September 5, 1925
101	4314	Establishing Rules Governing Navigation of the Panama Canal and Adjacent Waters	September 25, 1925
102	4315		September 29, 1925
103	4316		October 2, 1925
104	4331		October 28, 1935
105	4332		November 3, 1925
106	4349		November 30, 1925
107	4350		December 1, 1925
108	4351	Amending Executive Order 4274 of July 25, 1925, Which Restored to Its Previous status, for Use By Hawaii as Site for Public Schools, Part of Military Reservation of Schofield Barracks (Waianae-Uka), Island of Oahu, Hawaii, So as to Correct Azimuth of 2D Course of Property Incorrectly Described in Said Order	December 2, 1925
109	4352		December 5, 1925
110	4353	General Regulations for the Government of the Dominican Customs Receivership Under the Convention of December 27, 1924, Between the United States of America and the Dominican Republic	December 5, 1925
111	4353-A		December 9, 1925
112	4353-B		December 9, 1925
113	4353-C		December 9, 1925
114	4353-D		December 9, 1925
115	4353-E		December 9, 1925
116	4354		December 11, 1925
117	4354-A		December 12, 1925
118	4354-B		December 12, 1925
119	4355		December 12, 1925
120	4356		December 15, 1925
121	4357		December 15, 1925
122	4358		December 16, 1925
123	4359		December 19, 1925
124	4359-A		December 19, 1925
125	4360		December 21, 1925
126	4361		December 23, 1925
127	4361-A		December 23, 1925
128	4361½		December 23, 1925
129	4362		December 28, 1925
130	4363	Malheur National Forest, Oregon, Diminished, and the Excluded Lands Restored to Entry Only for Adjustment of a Claim Thereto	December 29, 1925
131	4363-A	Alien Property Custodian Authorized to Sell Certain Specified Stocks of the Baltimore and Ohio Railroad Co., Formerly the Property of the Anglo-Austrian Bank	December 31, 1925

=== 1926 ===
Relative No.	Absolute No.	Title/Description	Date signed
132	4364	Certain Specified Islands and Rocks in the Pacific Ocean Off the Oregon Coast Reserved Pending Legislation for Use of Said Islands for Recreational Purposes or as Breeding Grounds for Water-Fowl and Other Native Birds	January 7, 1926
133	4373-A	Alien Property Custodian Authorized to Sell at Public Sale Stock in the Crex Carpet Company, Formerly the Property of Oscar Donner, Deceased	January 26, 1926
134	4374		January 26, 1926
135	4382-A	Prescribing Rules Governing the Granting and Issuing of Passports	February 12, 1926
136	4384	Certain Described Lands in Alabama Withdrawn for Classification and Pending Legislation [to Grant Said Lands to the State for Recreational Purposes]	February 19, 1926
137	4421	Lands Near Hydaburg and Klawak, Alaska, Returned to Tongass National Forest, Except for School Reservations	April 17, 1926
138	4439		May 8, 1926
139	4456-A	Establishing Reservoir Site Reserve No. 17, California	June 8, 1926
140	4457		June 11, 1926
141	4467	Establishing Johnston Island Reservation	June 29, 1926
142	4472-A	William W. Russell, Envoy Extraordinary and Minister Plenipotentiary of Siam, Made Eligible for Retention on Active Duty Until December 31, 1926	July 3, 1926
143	4473		July 8, 1926
144	4477-A	Retirement of Henry H. Morgan, Foreign Service Officer, Class 1, Ordered Effective July 31, 1926	July 14, 1926
145	4478	Certain Described Lands in Colorado Withdrawn Pending Resurvey	July 15, 1926
146	4517	Creating Customs Station in Sitka, Alaska	October 2, 1926
147	4523		October 18, 1926
148	4527	Directing that Employees of Alaska Railroad Permanently Residing in Municipalities on Line of Railroad be Permitted to Run for Municipal Office Therein	October 22, 1926
149	4535	Amending Description of Kuwaaohe Military Reservation Contained in Executive Order 2900 of July 2, 1918, Which Set Aside Lands on Island of Oahu, Hawaii, for Military Purposes, So as to Correct Azimuths and Distances Incorrectly Described in Said Order	October 29, 1926
150	4559	Certain Described Lands in New Mexico Withdrawn Pending Legislation for Use as a Power Site and for Irrigation Purposes	December 30, 1926

=== 1927 ===
Relative No.	Absolute No.	Title/Description	Date signed
151	4560	Certain Described Lands at Cauayan, Isabela Province, Luzon, P. I., Reserved for Military Purposes	January 5, 1927
152	4601	Prescribing Regulations Pertaining to the Award of the Distinguished Flying Cross	March 1, 1927
153	4627		April 7, 1927
154	4628	Lands in the State of Utah	April 13, 1927
155	4679	In General Relates to Lands Reserved for Military Purposes in the Territory of Hawaii	June 29, 1927
156	4712	Tongass National Forest, Alaska	August 30, 1927
157	4715		September 8, 1927
158	4736		October 4, 1927
159	4736-A		October 5, 1927
160	4737		October 5, 1927
161	4744	Tananarive, Madagascar, Added to Places Named in E.O. 4187 of April 1, 1925, as Unhealthful Foreign Service Post	October 20, 1927
162	4772	Designating Lagos, Nigeria, as an Unhealthful Foreign Service Post	November 28, 1927
163	4773	Prescribing A Manual for Courts-Martial, United States Army	November 29, 1927
164	4791	Edward M. Flesh, Treasurer and Liquidating Trustee of the Grain Corporation, Directed to Pay $115,419.98 into the Treasury in Final Settlement and Liquidation of Said Corporation, and the Records, Books of Accounts, and Files of the Food Administrator and the Wheat Director, Heretofore Held in Custody of Said Corporation, Ordered Transferred to Commerce Dept.	December 31, 1927

=== 1928 ===
Relative No.	Absolute No.	Title/Description	Date signed
165	4792	Canal Zone District Court Rules Pertaining to Court Clerks, the Bonds to be Given by them, and the Handling and Deposit of Money in the Registry of the Court Prescribed	January 3, 1928
166	4846-A	Frequencies Assigned to Government Radio Stations [Classified as Confidential]	March 30, 1928
167	4902	Executive Order 4846-A of March 30, 1928, Assigning Frequencies to Government Radio Stations, Amended as to Certain Frequencies Assigned to the Army [Not Classified as Confidential]	June 4, 1928
168	4919-A	Certain Described Lands in Arizona Withdrawn for Classification and Possible Inclusion in the San Carlos Irrigation Project	June 24, 1928
169	4930-A	Executive Order 4033-A of June 24, 1924, Reserving Certain Lands Within the Proposed San Carlos Project, Arizona, Revoked and Said Lands Restored to Entry	July 12, 1928
170	4986	Certain Described Lands in Osborn Townsite, in the Huntley Project Irrigation District, Montana, Reserved for the Use of the Agriculture Dept. as an Agricultural Field Station	November 2, 1928
171	5018	Treasury Sec'y Authorized to Retain in the Prohibition Service Certain Temporary Personnel Entitled to Military Preference Until Completion of Rating of Examination for the Position of Prohibition Agent, and to Reinstate Any of Said Preference Employees Dropped from Said Service Without Charges Subsequent to August 16, 1929	December 21, 1928

=== 1929 ===
Relative No.	Absolute No.	Title/Description	Date signed
172	5019	Mildred Brown Mclntosh Made Eligible for Appointment as Typist at the Naval Air Station, Pensacola, Florida, Without Regard to Civil Service Rules	January 2, 1929
173	5037	Lands in Utah Withdrawn for Classification and Pending Determination for Inclusion in Zion National Park	January 28, 1929
174	5075	Mrs. William M. Stuart, Sarah V. Kenner Made Eligible for Reinstatement as Clerk in Federal Service Without Regard to Length of Separation from Service	April 4, 1929

== Presidential proclamations ==
=== 1923 ===
Relative No.	Absolute No.	Title/Description	Date signed
1	1669	Announcing Death of President Warren G. Harding	August 4, 1923
2	1670	Reappointing James C. Davis, Director General of Railroads	August 13, 1923
3	1671	Enlarging Area of the Coconino National Forest, Arizona	August 14, 1923
4	1672	Modifying Area of the Tonto National Forest, Arizona	August 14, 1923
5	1673	Diminishing Area of the Prescott National Forest, Arizona	August 14, 1923
6	1674	Designating October 9, 1923, as Fire Prevention Day	September 17, 1923
7	1675	Setting Apart the Allegheny National Forest, Pennsylvania	September 24, 1923
8	1676	Setting Aside November 18–24, 1923, as National Education Week	September 26, 1923
9	1677	Modifying Boundaries of the Sitgreaves National Forest, Arizona	October 13, 1923
10	1678	Extending Time for Establishing Shipping Service, Etc., to Virgin Islands to May 1, 1924	October 25, 1923
11	1679	Setting Aside the Carlsbad Cave National Monument, New Mexico	October 25, 1923
12	1680	Designating Thursday, November 29, 1923, as a Day of General thanksgiving	November 5, 1923
13	1681	Extending Time for Paying Installments for Ceded Lands of Crow Indian Reservation, Montana	December 18, 1923
14	1682	Copyright Benefits to Canada Extended to Mechanical Musical reproduction	December 27, 1923

=== 1924 ===
Relative No.	Absolute No.	Title/Description	Date signed
15	1683	Prohibiting Illegal Shipment of Arms to Mexico	January 7, 1924
16	1684	Diminishing Area of the Chelan National Forest, Washington	January 16, 1924
17	1685	Announcing Death of Former President Woodrow Wilson	February 3, 1924
18	1686	Designating Week of April 21–27, 1924, as Forest Protection Week, Etc.	February 15, 1924
19	1687	Granting Amnesty and Pardon, Etc., in Certain Cases	March 5, 1924
20	1688	Determining Tariff Rates on Wheat and Wheat Products to Equalize Differences in Costs of Production, Etc.	March 7, 1924
21	1689	Prohibiting Illegal Shipment of Arms, Etc., to Honduras	March 22, 1924
22	1690	Extending Time for Establishing Shipping Service, Etc., to Virgin Islands to November 1, 1924	April 7, 1924
23	1691	Prescribing Additional Regulation for Protection of Migratory Birds	April 11, 1924
24	1692	Setting Aside the Chiricahua National Monument, Arizona	April 18, 1924
25	1693	Prohibiting Illegal Shipment of Arms, Etc., to Cuba	May 2, 1924
26	1694	Setting Aside the Craters of the Moon National Monument, Idaho	May 2, 1924
27	1695	Enlarging Area of the Natural Bridge National Forest, Virginia	May 5, 1924
28	1696	Increasing Duty on Sodium Nitrite to Equalize Differences in Costs of Production	May 6, 1924
29	1697	Prohibiting Export of Arms, Etc., to Honduras Except With Consent of Secretary of State	May 15, 1924
30	1698	Increasing Duty on Barium Dioxide to Equalize Differences in Costs of Production	May 19, 1924
31	1699	Abrogating Certain Agreements With Panama Respecting Canal Zone	May 28, 1924
32	1700	Modifying Boundaries of the Kaniksu National Forest, Idaho	June 4, 1924
33	1701	Extending Time for Paying Installments for Ceded Lands of Crow Indian Reservation, Montana	June 9, 1924
34	1702	Copyright Benefits to Subjects of the Union of South Africa Extended to Mechanical Musical Reproduction	June 30, 1924
35	1703	Establishing Nationality Quota of Aliens Allowed Entry During Fiscal Year 1924-1925	June 30, 1924
36	1704	Enlarging Area of the Pinnacles National Monument, California	July 2, 1924
37	1705	Amending Regulations for Protection of Migratory Birds	July 2, 1924
38	1706	Diminishing Area or the Lincoln National Forest, New Mexico	July 17, 1924
39	1707	Setting Aside Cherokee National Game Refuges Numbers One and Two, Tennessee-Georgia	August 5, 1924
40	1708	Enlarging Area of the Medicine Bow National Forest, Wyoming	August 8, 1924
41	1709	Revoking Prohibition Against Shipment of Arms, Etc., to Cuba	August 29, 1924
42	1710	Enlarging Area of the Manzano National Forest, New Mexico	August 29, 1924
43	1711	Directing Disposal of Certain Lands Within Former Devils Lake Indian Reservation, North Dakota	August 29, 1924
44	1712	Designating October 9, 1924, as Fire Prevention Day	September 12, 1924
45	1713	Setting Apart Designated Historic Forts as National Monuments	October 15, 1924
46	1714	Extending Time for Establishing Shipping Service, Etc., to Virgin Islands to May 1, 1925	October 23, 1924
47	1715	Designating Thursday, November 27, 1924, as a Day of General Thanksgiving	November 5, 1924
48	1716	Urging Observance or Week Beginning November 17 as American Education Week	November 11, 1924
49	1717	Increasing Duty on Diethylbarbituric Acid, Etc., to Equalize Differences in Costs of Production	November 14, 1924
50	1718	Enlarging Area of the Harney National Forest, South Dakota	November 18, 1924
51	1719	Enlarging Area of the Targhee National Forest, Idaho and Wyoming	November 20, 1924
52	1720	Copyright Benefits to Citizens of Switzerland Extended to Mechanical Musical Reproduction	November 22, 1924
53	1721	Setting Aside the Wupatki National Monument, Arizona	December 9, 1924
54	1722	Transferring the Old Honolulu Customhouse Site to Territory of Hawaii	December 22, 1924
55	1723	Increasing Duty on Oxalic Acid to Equalize Differences in Costs of Production	December 29, 1924

=== 1925 ===
Relative No.	Absolute No.	Title/Description	Date signed
56	1724	Enlarging Area of the Manti National Forest, Utah	January 7, 1925
57	1725	Enlarging Area of the Custer State Park Game Sanctuary, South Dakota	January 8, 1925
58	1726	Diminishing Area of the Snoqualmie and Olympic National Forests, Washington	January 10, 1925
59	1727	Enlarging Area of the Carson National Forest, New Mexico	January 21, 1925
60	1728	Modifying Boundaries of the Apache, Crook, and Datil National Forests, Arizona and New Mexico	January 23, 1925
61	1729	Setting Aside a Game Refuge in South Dakota	February 2, 1925
62	1730	Setting Aside the Meriwether Lewis National Monument, Tennessee	February 6, 1925
63	1731	Convening Special Session of the Senate	February 14, 1925
64	1732	Designating Week of April 27-May 3, 1925, as Forest Protection Week, Etc.	February 21, 1925
65	1733	Setting Aside the Glacier Bay National Monument, Alaska	February 26, 1925
66	1746	Designating the Week Beginning Sunday, October 4, 1925, as National Fire Prevention Week	September 11, 1925

=== 1929 ===
Relative No.	Absolute No.	Title/Description	Date signed
67	1869	Increasing Rate of Duty on Whole Eggs, Egg Yolk, and Egg Albumen, Frozen or Otherwise Prepared or Preserved and Not Specially Provided for	February 20, 1929
