= List of executive actions by Lyndon B. Johnson =

There are various kinds of executive actions that United States presidents may take.

Executive orders are issued to help officers and agencies of the executive branch manage the operations within the federal government itself. Presidential memoranda are closely related, and have the force of law on the Executive Branch, but are generally considered less prestigious. Presidential memoranda do not have an established process for issuance, and unlike executive orders, they are not numbered. A presidential determination is a determination resulting in an official policy or position of the executive branch of the United States government. A presidential proclamation is a statement issued by a president on a matter of public policy issued under specific authority granted to the president by Congress and typically on a matter of widespread interest. Administrative orders are signed documents such as notices, letters, and orders that can be issued to conduct administrative operations of the federal government. A presidential notice or a presidential sequestration order can also be issued. National security directives^{1} operate like executive orders, but are only in the area of national security. They have been issued by different presidents under various names.

Listed below are executive orders numbered 11128–11451 signed by United States President Lyndon B. Johnson (1963–1969). He issued 325 executive orders. His executive orders are also listed on Wikisource, along with his presidential proclamations.

Signature of Lyndon B. Johnson

== Executive orders ==
=== 1963 ===
Relative No.	Absolute No.	Title/Description	Date signed
1	11128	Closing Government Departments and Agencies on November 25, 1963	November 23, 1963
2	11129	Designating Certain Facilities of the National Aeronautics and Space Administration and of the Department of Defense, in the State of Florida, as the John F. Kennedy Space Center	November 29, 1963
3	11130	Appointing a Commission to Report Upon the Assassination of President John F. Kennedy	November 29, 1963
4	11131	Creating an Emergency Board to Investigate Disputes Between the Braniff Airways, Inc., Continental Airlines, Inc., Eastern Air Lines, Inc., National Airlines, Inc., Northwest Airlines, Inc., and Trans World Airlines, Inc., and Certain of Their Employees	December 11, 1963
5	11132	Establishing the Interagency Committee on Export Expansion	December 12, 1963
6	11133	Inspection of Income, Estate, and Gift Tax Returns by the Senate Committee on Rules and Administration	December 17, 1963
7	11134	Extension of the President's Commission on Registration and Voting Participation	December 20, 1963

=== 1964 ===
Relative No.	Absolute No.	Title/Description	Date signed
8	11135	Creating an emergency board to investigate disputes between the carriers represented by the Eastern, Western and Southeastern Carriers' Conference Committee, and certain of their employees	January 3, 1964
9	11136	Establishing the President's Committee on Consumer Interstate and the Consumer Advisory Council	January 3, 1964
10	11137	Relating to certain allowances and benefits for civilian employees of nonappropriated fund instrumentalities of the Armed Forces	January 7, 1964
11	11138	Modifying Executive Order No., as amended by Executive Order No. 10103, providing for the transfer of personnel to certain public international organizations	January 7, 1964
12	11139	Authorizing acceptance of the United Nations Medal and Service Ribbon	January 7, 1964
13	11140	Delegating certain functions of the President relating to the Public Health Service	January 30, 1964
14	11141	Declaring a public policy against discriminating on the basis of age	February 12, 1964
15	11142	Prescribing regulations governing the allowance of travel expenses of claimants and beneficiaries of the Veterans' Administration and their attendants	February 12, 1964
16	11143	Public Advisory Committee for Trade Negotiations	March 2, 1964
17	11144	Establishing the Temporary Alaska Claims Commission	March 5, 1964
18	11145	Providing for a Curator of the White House and establishing a Committee for the Preservation of the White House	March 7, 1964
19	11146	Amendment of Executive Order No. 10204, prescribing regulations governing the payment of basic allowances for quarters	March 13, 1964
20	11147	Creating an emergency board to investigate disputes between the carriers represented by the National Railway Labor Conference and certain of their employees	March 17, 1964
21	11148	Designating the Secretary of the Interior as a member of the Interagency Committee on Export Expansion	March 23, 1964
22	11149	Establishing the President's Advisory Committee on Supersonic Transport	April 1, 1964
23	11150	Establishing the Federal Reconstruction and Development Planning Commission for Alaska	April 2, 1964
24	11151	Suspension of the provisions of section 5770 of Title 10, United States Code, relating to promotion of certain officers of the regular Navy	April 8, 1964
25	11152	Establishing the President's Committee on Manpower	April 15, 1964
26	11153	Inspection of income, estate, and gift tax returns by the Senate Committee on the Judiciary	April 17, 1964
27	11154	Exemption of J. Edgar Hoover from compulsory retirement for age	May 8, 1964
28	11155	Providing for the recognition of certain students as Presidential Scholars	May 23, 1964
29	11156	Establishing a Maritime Advisory Committee	June 17, 1964
30	11157	Prescribing regulations relating to incentive pay for hazardous duty, special pay for sea duty and duty at certain places, basic allowances for subsistence, and basic allowances for quarters	June 22, 1964
31	11158	Designating the Attorney General as the officer authorized to administer the provisions of the Austrian Assets Agreement of January 30, 1959	June 22, 1964
32	11159	Amendment of No. 11143, relating to the Public Advisory Committee for Trade Negotiations	June 23, 1964
33	11160	Prescribing regulations relating to medical care for retired ships' officers and members of crews of vessels of the Coast and Geodetic Survey and dependents of active and retired ships' officers and crew members	July 6, 1964
34	11161	Relating to certain relationships between the Department of Defense and the Federal Aviation Agency	July 7, 1964
35	11162	Adding the Postmaster General to the membership of the President's Committee on Equal Employment Opportunity	July 28, 1964
36	11163	Including a certain tract of land of Fannin County, Georgia, in the Chattahoochee National Forest	July 28, 1964
37	11164	Amending Executive Order No. 10530, relating to the performance by the Director of the Bureau of the Budget of certain functions vested in the President	August 1, 1964
38	11165	Setting aside for the use of the United States certain public lands and other public property located at the Fort Shafter Military Reservation, Hawaii	August 15, 1964
39	11166	Setting aside for the use of the United States certain public lands and other public property located at the Makua Military Reservation, Hawaii	August 15, 1964
40	11167	Setting aside for the use of the United States certain public lands and other public property located at the Pohakuloa Training Area, Hawaii	August 15, 1964
41	11168	Creating an emergency board to investigate disputes between the carriers represented by the National Railway Labor Conference and certain of their employees	August 18, 1964
42	11169	Creating an emergency board to investigate disputes between the carriers represented by the National Railway Labor Conference and certain of their employees	August 18, 1964
43	11170	Creating an emergency board to investigate disputes between the carriers represented by the National Railway Labor Conference and certain of their employees	August 18, 1964
44	11171	The Canal Zone Merit System and regulations relating to conditions of employment in the Canal Zone	August 18, 1964
45	11172	Setting aside for the use of the United States certain public lands and other public property located at the Kapalama Military Reservation, Hawaii	August 19, 1964
46	11173	Amending Executive Order No. 11073, relating to Federal salary administration	August 20, 1964
47	11174	Establishing the Presidential Service Certificate and the Presidential Service Badge	September 1, 1964
48	11175	Exclusion for original or new Canadian issues as required for international monetary stability	September 2, 1964
49	11176	Inspection of certain interest equalization tax information returns by the Board of Governors of the Federal Reserve System and the Federal Reserve Banks	September 3, 1964
50	11177	Providing for certain arrangements under the Columbia River Treaty	September 16, 1964
51	11178	Providing for the transfer of lands in Georgia from the Chattahoochee National Forest to the Oconee National Forest; the addition of land in Indiana to the Hoosier National Forest; the addition of land in Oklahoma to the Ouachita National Forest; and the adjustment of the boundary of the Tombigbee National Forest, Mississippi	September 18, 1964
52	11179	Providing for the National Defense Executive Reserve	September 22, 1964
53	11180	Creating an Emergency Board To Investigate Disputes Between the Carriers Represented by the National Railway Labor Conference and Certain of Their Employees	September 24, 1964
54	11181	Creating a Board of Inquiry To Report on Certain Labor Disputes Affecting the Maritime Industry of the United States	September 30, 1964
55	11182	Establishing Federal Development Planning Committees for Alaska	October 2, 1964
56	11183	Establishing the President's Commission on White House Fellowships	October 3, 1964
57	11184	Amending Executive Order No. 10530, Relating to the Performance of Certain Functions Vested in or Subject to the Approval of the President	October 13, 1964
58	11185	To facilitate coordination of Federal education programs	October 16, 1964
59	11186	Establishing the Federal Development Planning Committee for Appalachia	October 23, 1964
60	11187	Permitting Certain Employees of the Postal Field Service to be Given Career Appointments	October 24, 1964
61	11188	Amending the Selective Service regulations	November 17, 1964
62	11189	Placing Certain Positions in levels IV and V of the Federal Executive Salary Schedule	November 23, 1964
63	11190	Providing for the Screening of the Ready Reserve of the Armed Forces	December 29, 1964

=== 1965 ===
Relative No.	Absolute No.	Title/Description	Date signed
64	11191	Providing for the carrying out of certain provisions of the Communications Satellite Act of 1962	January 4, 1965
65	11192	Inspection of income, estate, and gift tax returns by the Senate Committee on Rules and Administration	January 13, 1965
66	11193	Winston Spencer Churchill	January 24, 1965
67	11194	Inspection of income, excess-profits, estate, and gift tax returns by the Senate Committee on Government Operations	January 26, 1965
68	11195	Placing additional positions in levels IV and V of the Federal Executive Salary Schedule	January 30, 1965
69	11196	Providing for the performance by the Housing and Home Finance Administrator of certain functions vested in or subject to the approval of the President	February 2, 1965
70	11197	Establishing the President's Council on Equal Opportunity	February 5, 1965
71	11198	Imposition of interest equalization tax on certain commercial bank loans	February 10, 1965
72	11199	Discontinuing the defensive sea area off the coast of North Carolina	February 24, 1965
73	11200	Providing for establishing user fees pursuant to the Land and Water Conservation Fund Act of 1965	February 26, 1965
74	11201	Inspection of income, excess-profits, estate, and gift tax returns by the Committee on Government Operations, House of Representatives	March 4, 1965
75	11202	Permitting student trainees to be given career or career-conditional appointments	March 5, 1965
76	11203	Permitting certain qualified employees of the Treasury Department to be given career appointment	March 12, 1965
77	11204	Inspection of income, estate, and gift tax returns by the Committee on Public Works, House of Representatives	March 12, 1965
78	11205	Revoking Executive Order No. 10729 of September 16, 1957	March 15, 1965
79	11206	Inspection of interest equalization tax returns	March 18, 1965
80	11207	Providing Federal assistance in the State of Alabama	March 20, 1965
81	11208	Revoking Executive orders pertaining to the President's Advisory Council on the Arts	March 24, 1965
82	11209	Establishing the Federal Development Committee for Appalachia and prescribing other arrangements for coordination with the Appalachia Regional Commission	March 25, 1965
83	11210	Establishing a Temporary Commission on Pennsylvania Avenue	March 25, 1965
84	11211	Exclusion for original or new Japanese issues as required for international monetary stability	April 2, 1965
85	11212	Including certain lands within the boundaries of the Allegheny National Forest in Pennsylvania	April 2, 1965
86	11213	Inspection of certain interest equalization tax information returns by the Board of Governors of the Federal Reserve System and the Federal Reserve Banks	April 2, 1965
87	11214	Amendment of Executive Order No. 11052, relating to cotton textiles and cotton textile products	April 7, 1965
88	11215	Establishing the President's Commission on the Patent System	April 8, 1965
89	11216	Designation of Vietnam and waters adjacent thereto as a combat zone for the purposes of section 112 of the Internal Revenue Code of 1954	April 24, 1965
90	11217	Inspection of income, excess—profits, estate, and gift tax returns by the Committee on Un-American Activities, House of Representatives	April 24, 1965
91	11218	Amending Executive Order No. 11017 so as to make the Chairman of the Tennessee Valley Authority a member of the Recreation Advisory Council	April 24, 1965
92	11219	Providing for the appointment in the competitive service of certain present and former officers and employees of the Foreign Service	May 6, 1965
93	11220	Transferring lands in the State of Washington from the Okanogan National Forest to the Wenatchee National Forest	May 6, 1965
94	11221	Amendment of Executive Order No. 11126, relating to the status of women	May 6, 1965
95	11222	Prescribing standards of ethical conduct for Government officers and employees	May 8, 1965
96	11223	Relating to the performance of functions authorized by the Foreign Assistance Act of 1961, as amended	May 12, 1965
97	11224	Designation of certain foreign countries as economically less developed countries for purposes of the interest equalization tax	May 13, 1965
98	11225	Designating the International Coffee Organization as a public international organization entitled to enjoy certain privileges, exemptions, and immunities	May 22, 1965
99	11226	Amending Executive Order No. 10358, relating to the observance of holidays by Government agencies	May 27, 1965
100	11227	Designating the Interim Communications Satellite Committee as a public international organization entitled to enjoy certain privileges, exemptions, and immunities	June 2, 1965
101	11228	Providing for the performance by the Civil Service Commission of certain functions vested in or subject to the approval of the President	June 14, 1965
102	11229	Participation in the International Coffee Organization	June 14, 1965
103	11230	Delegating certain functions of the President to the Director of the Bureau of the Budget	June 28, 1965
104	11231	Establishing the Vietnam Service Medal	July 8, 1965
105	11232	Suspension of the provision of section 5751(b) of Title 10, United States Code, which relates to officers in the line of the Navy of the grade of commander	July 8, 1965
106	11233	Adlai E. Stevenson	July 14, 1965
107	11234	Establishing the President's Commission on Crime in the District of Columbia	July 16, 1965
108	11235	Inspection of income, estate, and gift tax returns by the Committee on Banking and Currency, House of Representatives	July 21, 1965
109	11236	Establishing the President's Commission on Law Enforcement and Administration of Justice	July 23, 1965
110	11237	Prescribing regulations for coordinating planning and the acquisition of land under the outdoor recreation program of the Department of the Interior and the open space program of the Housing and Home Finance Agency	July 27, 1965
111	11238	The National Advisory Council on International Monetary and Financial Problems	July 28, 1965
112	11239	Enforcement of the Convention for Safety of Life at Sea, 1960	July 31, 1965
113	11240	The Board of the Foreign Service and the Board of Examiners for the Foreign Service	August 4, 1965
114	11241	Amending the Selective Service regulations	August 26, 1965
115	11242	Amending Executive Order No. 11157 as it relates to incentive pay for hazardous duty	August 28, 1965
116	11243	Creating an emergency board to investigate dispute between the Atchison, Topeka and Santa Fe Railway Company, Lines East and West, and certain of their employees	September 11, 1965
117	11244	Placing a position in level IV of the Federal Executive Salary Schedule	September 16, 1965
118	11245	Placing a position in level V of the Federal Executive Salary Schedule	September 16, 1965
119	11246	Equal Employment Opportunity	September 24, 1965
120	11247	Providing for the coordination by the Attorney General of enforcement of Title VI of the Civil Rights Act of 1964	September 24, 1965
121	11248	Placing certain positions in levels IV and V of the Federal Executive Salary Schedule	October 10, 1965
122	11249	Amending regulations relating to the safeguarding of vessels, harbors, ports, and waterfront facilities of the United States	October 10, 1965
123	11250	Administration of the Peace Corps in the Department of State	October 10, 1965
124	11251	Placing an additional position in level V of the Federal Executive Salary Schedule	October 19, 1965
125	11252	Food-for-Peace Program	October 20, 1965
126	11253	Amending Executive Order No. 11157 as it relates to incentive pay for hazardous duty	October 20, 1965
127	11254	Establishing the Automotive Agreement Adjustment Assistance Board	October 21, 1965
128	11255	Designation of Vietnam and waters adjacent thereto as an overseas combat area for purposes of Armed Forces mailing privileges	November 1, 1965
129	11256	Establishing the President's Committee on Food and Fiber and the National Advisory Commission on Food and Fiber	November 4, 1965
130	11257	Delegating to the Civil Service Commission certain authority relating to severance pay under the Federal Employees Salary Act of 1965	November 13, 1965
131	11258	Prevention, control, and abatement of water pollution by Federal activities	November 17, 1965
132	11259	Amending Executive Order No. 11157 as it relates to incentive pay for hazardous duty involving parachute jumping	December 3, 1965
133	11260	Amending Executive Order No. 11185 relating to facilities coordination of Federal education programs	December 11, 1965
134	11261	Amending Executive Order No. 10973 of November 3, 1961, providing for the administration of foreign assistance and related functions	December 11, 1965
135	11262	Placing additional positions in levels IV and V of the Federal Executive Salary Schedule	December 13, 1965
136	11263	Further amending Executive Order No. 10713, providing for administration of the Ryukyu Islands	December 20, 1965
137	11264	The Board of the Foreign Service and the Board of Examiners for the Foreign Service	December 31, 1965

=== 1966 ===
Relative No.	Absolute No.	Title/Description	Date signed
138	11265	Amending Executive Order No. 10448, establishing the National Defense Service Medal	January 11, 1966
139	11266	Amending the Selective Service regulations	January 18, 1966
140	11267	Relating to the Implementation of the Treaty of Friendship and General Relations between the United States and Spain	January 19, 1966
141	11268	Placing an additional position in level V of the Federal Executive Salary Schedule	January 20, 1966
142	11269	National Advisory Council on International Monetary and Financial Policies	February 14, 1966
143	11270	Suspension of section 5232(b) of Title 10, United States Code, which relates to the number of lieutenant generals in the Marine Corps	February 19, 1966
144	11271	Fleet Admiral Chester E. Nimitz	February 21, 1966
145	11272	To except employees of the postal field service from certain provisions of Executive Order No. 10358, as amended by Executive Order No. 11226, relating to the observance of holidays by Government agencies	February 23, 1966
146	11273	Placing an additional position in level V of the Federal Executive Salary Schedule	March 22, 1966
147	11274	Providing that certain officers may act as Secretary of Housing and Urban Development	March 30, 1966
148	11275	Amending Executive Order No. 11230 delegating certain functions of the President to the Director of the Bureau of the Budget	March 31, 1966
149	11276	Creating an emergency board to investigate disputes between the carriers represented by the Five Carriers Negotiating Committee and certain of their employees	April 21, 1966
150	11277	Designating the International Telecommunications Satellite Consortium as an international organization entitled to enjoy certain privileges, exemptions, and immunities	April 30, 1966
151	11278	Establishing a President's Council and a Committee on Recreation and Natural Beauty	May 4, 1966
152	11279	Establishing the President's Committee on Health Manpower and the National Advisory Commission on Health Manpower	May 7, 1966
153	11280	Establishing the President's Committee on Mental Retardation	May 11, 1966
154	11281	Transferring jurisdiction over certain blocked assets from the Attorney General to the Secretary of the Treasury	May 13, 1966
155	11282	Prevention, control, and abatement of air pollution by Federal activities	May 26, 1966
156	11283	Designating the International Cotton Institute as a public international organization entitled to enjoy certain privileges, exemptions, and immunities	May 27, 1966
157	11284	Suspension of the provisions of sections 5701(a)(1) and 6371 of Title 10, United States Code, which relate to the continuation on the active list of rear admirals in the line of the Navy not restricted in the performance of duty	May 27, 1966
158	11285	Designation of certain foreign countries as economically less developed countries for purposes of the interest equalization tax	June 10, 1966
159	11286	Designating the Department of Commerce as the Department through which the United States shall participate in the Inter-American Cultural and Trade Center in Dade County, Florida	June 10, 1966
160	11287	Award and presentation of the National Medal of Science	June 28, 1966
161	11288	Prevention, control, and abatement of water pollution by Federal activities	July 2, 1966
162	11289	National Advisory Commission on Selective Service	July 2, 1966
163	11290	Amending Executive Order No. 11230, delegating certain functions of the President to the Director of the Bureau of the Budget	July 21, 1966
164	11291	Creating an emergency board to investigate a dispute between the American Airlines, Inc., and certain of its employees	July 27, 1966
165	11292	Amending Executive Order No. 11157 as its relates to incentive pay for hazardous duty, and special pay for sea duty at certain places	August 1966
166	11293	Placing an additional position in level V of the Federal Executive Salary Schedule	August 3, 1966
167	11294	Delegating certain authority of the President to establish maximum per diem rates for Government civilian personnel in travel status	August 4, 1966
168	11295	Rules governing the granting, issuing, and verifying of United States passports	August 5, 1966
169	11296	Evaluation of flood hazard in locating Federally owned or financed buildings, roads, and other facilities, and in disposing of Federal lands and properties	August 10, 1966
170	11297	Coordinates of Federal urban programs	August 11, 1966
171	11298	Prescribing the interest rate for deposit of savings of members of the Uniformed Services	August 14, 1966
172	11299	Placing an additional position in level V of the Federal Executive Salary Schedule	August 15, 1966
173	11300	Relating to the implementation of the Convention between the United States and Greece	August 17, 1966
174	11301	Establishing the President's Committee on Libraries and the National Advisory Commission on Libraries	September 2, 1966
175	11302	Prescribing regulations governing the allowance of travel expenses of claimants and beneficiaries of the Veterans' Administration and their attendants	September 6, 1966
176	11303	Modifying Executive Order No. 9721, as amended by Executive Order No. 10103, providing for the transfer of personnel to certain international organizations	September 12, 1966
177	11304	Amending Executive Order No. 11175 relating to the exclusion for original or new Canadian issues where required for international monetary stability	September 12, 1966
178	11305	Authorizing the Secretary of Army and the Governor of the Canal Zone, respectively, to perform certain functions relating to the Panama Canal and the Canal Zone	September 12, 1966
179	11306	Establishing the President's Committee on Rural Poverty and the National Advisory Commission on Rural Poverty	September 27, 1966
180	11307	Coordination of Federal programs affecting agricultural and rural area development	September 30, 1966
181	11308	Creating an emergency board to investigate a dispute between the Pan American World Airways, Inc., and certain of its employees	September 30, 1966
182	11309	Amending Executive Order No. 11215, relating to the President's Commission on the Patent System	October 6, 1966
183	11310	Assigning emergency preparedness functions to the Attorney General	October 11, 1966
184	11311	Carrying out provisions of the Beirut Agreement of 1948 relating to audio-visual materials	October 14, 1966
185	11312	Designating the Secretary of State to perform functions relating to certain objects of cultural significance imported into the United States for temporary display or exhibition	October 14, 1966
186	11313	Providing that certain officers may act as Postmaster General	October 15, 1966
187	11314	Creating a Board of Inquiry to report on certain labor disputes affecting the military jet engine industry, military aircraft industry, military armament industry and military electronics industry of the United States	October 17, 1966
188	11315	Amending the civil service rules to authorize an executive assignment system for positions in Grades 16, 17, and 18 of the General Schedule	November 17, 1966
189	11316	Placing an additional position in level V of the Federal Executive Salary Schedule	November 28, 1966
190	11317	Amending paragraph 127c of the Manual for Courts-Martial, United States, 1951	December 3, 1966
191	11318	Designating the European Space Research Organization as a public international organization entitled to enjoy privileges, exemptions, and immunities	December 5, 1966
192	11319	Amending Executive Order No. 10707, establishing a seal for the United States Coast Guard	December 9, 1966
193	11320	Delegating authority to prescribe rules and regulations relating to foreign gifts and decorations	December 12, 1966
194	11321	Creating a Board of Inquiry to report on a labor dispute affecting the military aircraft engine industry of the United States	December 19, 1966

=== 1967 ===
Relative No.	Absolute No.	Title/Description	Date signed
195	11322	Relating to trade and other transactions involving Southern Rhodesia	January 5, 1967
196	11323	Placing an additional position in level V of the Federal Executive Salary Schedule	January 20, 1967
197	11324	Creating an emergency board to investigate disputes between the carriers represented by the National Railway Labor Conference and certain of their employees	January 28, 1967
198	11325	Prescribing a new part of the Selective Service regulations	January 30, 1967
199	11326	Providing for the regulation of air transportation in the Ryukyu Islands	February 13, 1967
200	11327	Assigning authority to order certain persons in the Ready Reserve to active duty	February 15, 1967
201	11328	Modifying Executive Order No. 11198, relating to the interest equalization tax on certain commercial bank loans	February 20, 1967
202	11329	Creating a Board of Inquiry to report on a labor dispute affecting the shipbuilding and repair industries of the United States	March 2, 1967
203	11330	Providing for the coordination of youth opportunity by programs	March 5, 1967
204	11331	Establishment of the Pacific Northwest River Basins Commission	March 6, 1967
205	11332	Inspection of income, excess-profits, estate, and gift tax returns by the Committee on Government Operations, House of Representatives	March 7, 1967
206	11333	Partially suspending section 6374 of Title 10 of the United States Code, relating to retirement of brigadier generals of the Marine Corps	March 7, 1967
207	11334	Enjoyment of certain privileges, exemptions, and immunities by the Asian Development Bank and coordination of United States policies with regard to the Bank	March 7, 1967
208	11335	Placing an additional position in level V of the Federal Executive Salary Schedule	March 9, 1967
209	11336	Delegating to the Secretary of Agriculture certain authority relating to emergency livestock feed	March 22, 1967
210	11337	Inspection of income, excess-profits, estate, and gift tax returns by the Senate Committee on Government Operations	March 25, 1967
211	11338	Placing an additional position in level V of the Federal Executive Salary Schedule	March 27, 1967
212	11339	Delegating certain authority of the President with regard to Army and Air Force rations	March 28, 1967
213	11340	Effective date of Department of Transportation Act	March 30, 1967
214	11341	Establishing the President's Commission on Postal Organization	April 8, 1967
215	11342	The Quetico-Superior Committee	April 10, 1967
216	11343	Creating an emergency board to investigate the disputes between the Long Island Rail Road and certain of its employees	April 12, 1967
217	11344	Creating a Board of Inquiry to report on a labor dispute affecting the military aircraft industry and the military aircraft engine industry of the United States	April 15, 1967
218	11345	Establishment of the Great Lakes Basin Commission	April 20, 1967
219	11346	Placing an additional position in level V of the Federal Salary Schedule	April 20, 1967
220	11347	Amendment of Executive Order No. 11210, establishing a Temporary Commission on Pennsylvania Avenue	April 20, 1967
221	11348	Providing for the further training of Government employees	April 20, 1967
222	11349	Amending Executive Order No. 11136, relating to the President's Commission on Consumer Interests and the Consumer Advisory Council	May 1, 1967
223	11350	Amending the Selective Service regulations	May 3, 1967
224	11351	Amending Executive Order No. 11318, designating the European Space Research Organization as a public international organization	May 22, 1967
225	11352	Suspending a provision of section 5751(b) of Title 10, United States Code, which relates to officers of the Marine Corps in the grade of lieutenant colonel	May 22, 1967
226	11353	Establishing the President's Advisory Council on Cost Reduction	May 23, 1967
227	11354	Amending Executive Order No. 11030 of June 19, 1962, with respect to the preparation of Presidential proclamations	May 23, 1967
228	11355	Amending Executive Order No. 10647 respecting certain appointments under the Defense Production Act of 1950	May 26, 1967
229	11356	Creating an emergency board to investigate disputes between the carriers represented by the National Railway Labor Conference and certain of their employees	May 30, 1967
230	11357	Administration of the National Traffic and Motor Vehicle Safety Act through the National Highway Safety Bureau and its director	June 6, 1967
231	11358	Inspection of income, excess-profits, estate, and gift tax returns by the Committee on Un-American Activities, House of Representatives	June 6, 1967
232	11359	Establishment of the Souris-Red-Rainy River Basins Commission	June 20, 1967
233	11359A	Adding the Secretary of Transportation to the membership of the President' Council on Recreation and Natural Beauty	June 29, 1967
234	11360	Amending the Selective Service regulations	June 30, 1967
235	11361	Suspending a provision of section 5751(b) of Title 10, United States Code, which relates to officers of the Marine Corps in the grade of first lieutenant	July 6, 1967
236	11362	Providing for the use of transportation priorities and allocations during the current railroad strike	July 16, 1967
237	11363	Designating the International Secretariat for Volunteer Service as a public international organization entitled to enjoy certain privileges, exemptions, and immunities	July 20, 1967
238	11364	Providing for the restoration of law and order in the State of Michigan	July 24, 1967
239	11365	Establishing a National Advisory Commission on Civil Disorders	July 29, 1967
240	11366	Assigning authority to order certain persons in the Ready Reserve to active duty	August 4, 1967
241	11367	Placing an additional position in level IV of the Federal Executive Salary Schedule	August 18, 1967
242	11368	Modifying rates of interest equalization tax and amending Executive Order No. 11211	August 28, 1967
243	11369	Placing additional positions in level V of the Federal Executive Salary Schedule	August 29, 1967
244	11370	Inspection of income, estate, and gift tax returns by the Committee on Public Works, House of Representatives	August 30, 1967
245	11371	Establishment of the New England River Basins Commission	September 6, 1967
246	11372	Designating the Lake Ontario Claims Tribunal as a public international organization entitled to enjoy certain privileges, exemptions, and immunities	September 18, 1967
247	11373	Providing for certain transfers from the National Capital Transportation Agency to the Washington Metropolitan Area Transit Authority	September 20, 1967
248	11374	Abolishing the Missile Sites Labor Commission and providing for the performance of its functions	October 11, 1967
249	11375	Amending Executive Order No. 11246, relating to equal employment opportunity	October 13, 1967
250	11376	Amending Executive Order No. 11022, relating to the President's Council on Aging	October 17, 1967
251	11377	Providing for Tariff Commission reports regarding the estimated consumption of certain brooms	October 23, 1967
252	11378	Exemption of Daniel J. Quill from compulsory retirement for age	October 31, 1967
253	11379	Designating officials to act as Commissioner of the District of Columbia	November 8, 1967
254	11380	Amending prior Executive orders relating to mutual educational and cultural exchange and to allowances and benefits for Government personnel on overseas duty	November 8, 1967
255	11381	Amending Executive Order No. 10807 of March 13, 1959, relating to the Federal Council for Science and Technology	November 8, 1967
256	11382	Amendment of Executive orders relating to functions of the Department of Transportation	November 28, 1967
257	11383	Inspection of income, excess-profits, estate, and gift tax returns by the Senate Select Committee on Standards and Conduct	November 30, 1967
258	11384	Placing an additional position in level V of the Federal Executive Salary Schedule	December 1, 1967
259	11385	Placing an additional position in level IV of the Federal Executive Salary Schedule	December 16, 1967
260	11386	Prescribing arrangements for coordination of the activities of regional commissions and activities of the Federal Government relating to regional economic development, and establishing the Federal Advisory Council on Regional Economic Development	December 28, 1967

=== 1968 ===
Relative No.	Absolute No.	Title/Description	Date signed
261	11387	Governing certain capital transfers abroad	January 1, 1968
262	11388	Designation of officers of the Department of Commerce to act as Secretary of Commerce	January 15, 1968
263	11389	Placing an additional position in level IV of the Federal Executive Salary Schedule	January 22, 1968
264	11390	Delegation of certain functions of the President to the Secretary of Defense	January 22, 1968
265	11391	Amending the Selective Service regulations	January 24, 1968
266	11392	Ordering certain units of the Ready Reserve of the Naval Reserve, Air Force Reserve and Air National Guard of the United States to active duty	January 25, 1968
267	11393	Amending Executive Order No. 11248, placing certain positions in levels IV and V of the Federal Executive Salary Schedule	January 25, 1968
268	11394	Establishing the President's Commission for the Observance of Human Rights Year 1968	January 30, 1968
269	11395	Further amending Executive Order No. 10713, providing for administration of the Ryukyu Islands	January 31, 1968
270	11396	Providing for the coordination by the Attorney General of Federal law enforcement and crime prevention programs	February 7, 1968
271	11397	Authorizing transitional appointments of veterans who have served during the Vietnam era	February 9, 1968
272	11398	Establishing the President's Council on Physical Fitness and Sports	March 4, 1968
273	11399	Establishing the National Council on Indian Opportunity	March 6, 1968
274	11400	Placing an additional position in level V of the Federal Executive Salary Schedule	March 11, 1968
275	11401	Modifying Executive Order No. 6868 of October 9, 1934, as amended, designating the authority to carry out the provisions of the District of Columbia Alley Dwelling Act	March 13, 1968
276	11402	Making the Vice President of the United States the Chairman of the President's Council on Recreation and Natural Beauty	March 29, 1968
277	11403	Providing for the restoration of law and order in the Washington Metropolitan Area	April 5, 1968
278	11404	Providing for the restoration of law and order in the State of Illinois	April 7, 1968
279	11405	Providing for the restoration of law and order in the State of Maryland	April 7, 1968
280	11406	Assigning authority with respect to ordering units in the Ready Reserve to active duty	April 10, 1968
281	11407	Amending Executive Order No. 11174, establishing the Presidential Service Certificate and the Presidential Service Badge	April 23, 1968
282	11408	Revoking Executive Order No. 9 of January 17, 1873, and amendatory orders, relating to dual Federal-State office holding, and Executive Order No. 9367 of August 4, 1943, prohibiting Government employees from instructing persons for certain Government examinations	April 25, 1968
283	11409	Amending Executive Order No. 11248, placing certain positions in levels IV and V of the Federal Executive Salary Schedule	April 29, 1968
284	11410	Amending Executive Order No. 11183, establishing the President's Commission on White House Fellowships	May 6, 1968
285	11411	Amending Executive Order No. 11394, relating to the President's Commission for the Observance of Human Rights Year 1968	May 13, 1968
286	11412	Establishing a National Commission on the Causes and Prevention of Violence	June 10, 1968
287	11413	Adjusting rates of pay for certain statutory schedules	June 11, 1968
288	11414	Adjusting the rates of monthly basic pay for members of the Uniformed Services	June 11, 1968
289	11415	Reconstituting the National Advisory Committee on the Selection of Physicians, Dentists, and Allied Specialists and the Health Resources Advisory Committee	June 24, 1968
290	11416	Placing an additional position in level V of the Federal Executive Salary Schedule	June 24, 1968
291	11417	Adding an Assistant Secretary of Commerce to the membership of the Development Loan Committee	July 24, 1968
292	11418	Extending the life of the President's Advisory Council on Cost Reduction	July 27, 1968
293	11419	Relating to trade and other transactions involving Southern Rhodesia	July 29, 1968
294	11420	Establishing the Export Expansion Advisory Committee	July 31, 1968
295	11421	Placing an additional position in level V of the Federal Executive Salary Schedule	August 9, 1968
296	11422	Cooperative Area Manpower Planning System	August 15, 1968
297	11423	Providing for the performance of certain functions heretofore performed by the President with respect to certain facilities constructed and maintained on the borders of the United States	August 16, 1968
298	11424	Amending Executive Order No. 11157 as it relates to incentive pay for hazardous duty involving aerial flight	August 29, 1968
299	11425	Study of United States foreign trade policy	August 30, 1968
300	11426	Federal-State liaison and cooperation	August 31, 1968
301	11427	Terminating the Maritime Advisory Committee	September 4, 1968
302	11428	Terminating the President's Advisory Committee on Supersonic Transport	September 5, 1968
303	11429	Amending Executive Order No. 11302, relating to travel expenses of claimants and beneficiaries of the Veteran's Administration and their attendants	September 9, 1968
304	11430	Prescribing the Manual for Courts-Martial, United States, 1969	September 11, 1968
305	11431	Creating a board of inquiry to report on certain labor disputes affecting the maritime industry of the United States	September 30, 1968
306	11432	Control of arms imports	October 22, 1968
307	11433	Creating an emergency board to investigate disputes between the Illinois Central Railroad Company, Louisville & Nashville Railroad Company, and the Belt Railway Company of Chicago, and certain of their employees	November 6, 1968
308	11434	Relating to the administration of the Foreign Service personnel systems of the United States, and for other purposes	November 8, 1968
309	11435	Designating the Secretary of the Interior to accept on behalf of the United States retrocession by any State of certain criminal and civil jurisdiction over Indian country	November 21, 1968
310	11436	Suspending the provisions of section 6372 of title 10 of the United States Code, which relate to the retirement or retention on the active list of certain rear admirals in the Navy	December 2, 1968
311	11437	Suspending the provisions of section 5751(b) of title 10 of the United States Code, relating to service-in-grade requirements for promotion of officers of the Navy and Marine Corps	December 2, 1968
312	11438	Prescribing procedures governing interdepartmental cash awards to the members of the Armed Forces	December 3, 1968
313	11439	Revoking Executive Order No. 11372, designating the Lake Ontario Claims Tribunal as a public international organization entitled to enjoy certain privileges, exemptions, and immunities	December 7, 1968
314	11440	Providing for the supplemental use of exhibits and displays created in furtherance of authorized programs of executive departments and agencies	December 11, 1968
315	11441	Amending Executive Order No. 11248, placing certain positions in levels IV and V of the Federal Executive Salary Schedule	December 23, 1968
316	11442	Creating an emergency board to investigate a dispute between the Long Island Railroad and certain of its employees	December 27, 1968

=== 1969 ===
Relative No.	Absolute No.	Title/Description	Date signed
317	11443	Creating an emergency board to investigate disputes between the carriers represented by the National Railway Labor Conference and certain of their employees	January 13, 1969
318	11444	Creating an emergency board to investigate disputes between the carriers represented by the National Railway Labor Conference and certain of their employees	January 13, 1969
319	11445	Creating an emergency board to investigate disputes between the carriers represented by the National Railway Labor Conference and certain of their employees	January 13, 1969
320	11446	Authorizing the acceptance of service medals and ribbons from multilateral organizations other than the United Nations	January 16, 1969
321	11447	Interagency Advisory Committee on Compensation for Motor Vehicle Accident Losses	January 16, 1969
322	11448	Establishing the Meritorious Service Medal	January 16, 1969
323	11449	Participation in the International Coffee Organization	January 17, 1969
324	11450	Designation of the Secretary of the Treasury to authorize associations to issue TIR Carnets and to act as guarantors under the Customs Convention on the International Transport of Goods under Cover of TIR Carnets	January 18, 1969
325	11451	Establishing the President's Commission on Personnel Interchange	January 19, 1969
