= List of executive actions by William McKinley =

The president of the United States may take any of several kinds of executive actions.

Executive orders are issued to help officers and agencies of the executive branch manage the operations within the federal government itself. Presidential memoranda are closely related, and have the force of law on the Executive Branch, but are generally considered less prestigious. Presidential memoranda do not have an established process for issuance, and unlike executive orders, they are not numbered. A presidential determination results in an official policy or position of the executive branch of the United States government. A presidential proclamation is a statement issued by a president on a matter of public policy, under specific authority granted to the president by Congress, typically on a matter of widespread interest. Administrative orders are signed documents such as notices, letters, and orders, that can be issued to conduct administrative operations of the federal government. A presidential notice or a presidential sequestration order can also be issued.

Listed below are executive orders numbered 97–140 signed by United States President William McKinley (1897–1901). He issued 185 executive orders. His executive orders are also listed on Wikisource.

Signature of William McKinley

== Executive orders ==
=== 1897 ===
Relative No.	Absolute No.	Title/Description	Date signed
1	97	Authorizing Appointment of Assistant Attorney General in Post Office Department Without Examination	April 24, 1897
2	98	Authorizing Appointment of Law Clerk in Post Office Department Without Examination	May 24, 1897
3	99	Consular Regulations Amended to Waive the Requirement of Personal Appearance of Shippers at Consulates for the Invoice Declaration	July 15, 1897
4	100	Revising the Tariff of Consular Fees	July 27, 1897
5	101	Amending Civil Service Rules Regarding Removal from Service	July 27, 1897
6	102	Amending Civil Service Rules to Include All Customs Houses in Classified Service	July 27, 1897
7	103	Amending Civil Service Rules Regarding Positions Excepted from Examination	July 27, 1897

=== 1898 ===
Relative No.	Absolute No.	Title/Description	Date signed
8	104	Amending Civil Service Rules Regarding Eligibility After Being Mustered into Military or Naval Service	May 13, 1898
9	105	Amending Civil Service Rules Making Certain Positions in Government Printing Office Subject to Apportionment	June 15, 1898
10	106	Requesting the Nation to Give Thanks for War Victories	July 6, 1898
11	106-1	Ordering the Permanent Marking of Graves of U.S. Soldiers at Santiago, Cuba	August 6, 1898
12	106½	Compensation of Consular Agents	August 26, 1898
13	107	Relatives, Employed by Government, of 1st District of Columbia Regiment of Volunteers Excused from Duty on Day Regiment Returns to Washington	September 7, 1898
14	108	Amending Consular Regulations Pertaining to Accounts of Consular Agents	October 10, 1898
15	108-A	Placing the Island of Guam Under the Control of the Navy Department	December 23, 1898
16	109	Closing Executive Departments for Funeral of Senator Morrill	December 29, 1898
17	110	Voiding the Contract Between the Republic of Hawaii and the Pacific Cable Co. of New York	December 31, 1898

=== 1899 ===
Relative No.	Absolute No.	Title/Description	Date signed
18	111	Authorizing Permanent Appointment of Certain Navy Department Personnel Temporarily Appointed Before September 15, 1898	January 20, 1899
19	112	Consideration of Half-Holiday for Grand Army of the Republic Members During Removal of Remains of John A. Rawlins to Arlington	February 8, 1899
20	113	Ordering Half-Masting of Flag During Removal of Remains of John A. Rawlins to Arlington	February 8, 1899
21	114	Ordering Tribute for Spanish–American War Dead, and Interment at Arlington National Cemetery on April 6, 1899	April 3, 1899
22	115	Amending Civil Service Rules to Except One Foreman of Job Division in Government Printing Service from Examination	April 18, 1899
23	116	Directing that the General Election Provided For by the Constitution of the Republic of Hawaii to Not Be Held	May 13, 1899
24	117	Government Employees Excused from Duty for Participation in Peace Jubilee	May 23, 1899
25	118	Permit for Cable from Borkum-Emden, Germany, to New York, N.Y., Granted to Deutsch-Atlantische Telegraphen Gesellschaft	May 27, 1899
26	119	Amending Civil Service Rules	May 29, 1899
27	120	Amending Civil Service Rules to Reinsert Position Excepted from Examination	June 6, 1899
28	121	Annulling Sales of Public Lands by Government of Hawaii Made After Resolution of Annexation	September 11, 1899
29	122	Discontinuing Issuance of Registers to Vessels by the Authorities of Hawaii	September 18, 1899

=== 1900 ===
Relative No.	Absolute No.	Title/Description	Date signed
30	123	Amending Civil Service Rules Regarding Reinstatement of Certain Post Office Employees	January 15, 1900
31	124	Amending Civil Service Rules to Except Clerk at Government Hospital for the Insane from Examination	January 22, 1900
32	125	Amending Civil Service Rules Regarding Promotion of War Veterans	January 29, 1900
33	125-A	Placing Certain Islands of the Samoan Group Under the Control of the Navy Department	February 19, 1900
34	126	Amending Civil Service Rules Regarding Retransfer of Certain People from Unclassified to Classified Service	March 16, 1900
35	127	Amending Civil Service Rules Regarding Transfer from Expected to Non-Expected Positions	March 16, 1900
36	128	Amending Civil Service Rules Regarding Age Limitation	March 29, 1900
37	129	Amending Civil Service Rules Regarding Transfer from Expected to Non-Expected Positions	April 17, 1900
38	130	Amending Civil Service Rules With Special rule Permitting Certain Navy employees to be Transferred as Civilians	May 24, 1900
39	130-A	Approving Franchise Granted by Republic of Hawaii to First American Bank of Hawaii	June 22, 1900
40	130-B	Approving Franchise Granted by Republic of Hawaii to Hilo Railroad Company	June 22, 1900
41	130-C	Approving Franchise Granted by Republic of Hawaii to Kohala and Hilo Railroad Company	June 22, 1900
42	130-D	Approving franchise Granted by Republic of Hawaii to Honolulu Rapid Transit and Land Company	June 25, 1900
43	131	Amending Civil Service Rules to Except All Paymasters' Clerks from Examination	June 29, 1900
44	132	Consular Court Fees and fines Made Official	July 13, 1900
45	133	Amending Civil Service Rules Regarding Exceptions from Examination for Draftsmen in Navy Department	November 20, 1900
46	134	Civil Service Commission Directed to Assist Philippine Civil Service Board	November 30, 1900

=== 1901 ===
Relative No.	Absolute No.	Title/Description	Date signed
47	135	Amending Consular Regulations Regarding Expiration of Passports	January 31, 1901
48	136	Amending Civil Service Rules Regarding Age Limitations in Light-House Service	February 26, 1901
49	137	Amending Civil Service Rules to Except Chinese Interpreters in Treasury Department from Examination	March 2, 1901
50	138	Providing that Fees be Collected for Bills of Health Issued to Foreign War Vessels	March 25, 1901
51	139	Granting Half-Holiday for Civil War and Spanish-American War Veterans in Government Service to Attend Ceremonies Honoring General John A. Logan	April 6, 1901
52	140	Amending Civil Service Rules Regarding Age Limitations in Post Office Service	July 31, 1901
