= Executive Order 12148 =

Presidential executive order

Executive Order 12148 was an executive order enacted by President Jimmy Carter on July 20, 1979, to transfer and reassign duties to the newly formed agency, known as the Federal Emergency Management Agency (FEMA), created by Executive Order 12127. The order combined several federal agencies tasked with emergency preparedness and civil defense spread across the executive departments into a unified entity that was established as an independent agency, free of Cabinet interference, with authority as the lead federal agency in a presidentially-declared disaster.

The agency's place within the governmental structure was changed on March 1, 2003, when FEMA became part of the Department of Homeland Security's Emergency Preparedness and Response Directorate.

== Revocations ==
E.O. 12148 also revoked the following Executive Orders or parts thereof: (E.O. Numbers)

10242; Sections 1 and 2 of 10296; 10494; 10601; 10634; 10900; 10952; 11051; 11415; 11795; 11725; and 11749.
