= List of executive actions by Warren G. Harding =

The president of the United States may take any of several kinds of executive actions.

Executive orders are issued to help officers and agencies of the executive branch manage the operations within the federal government itself. Presidential memoranda are closely related, and have the force of law on the Executive Branch, but are generally considered less prestigious. Presidential memoranda do not have an established process for issuance, and unlike executive orders, they are not numbered. A presidential determination results in an official policy or position of the executive branch of the United States government. A presidential proclamation is a statement issued by a president on a matter of public policy, under specific authority granted to the president by Congress, typically on a matter of widespread interest. Administrative orders are signed documents such as notices, letters, and orders, that can be issued to conduct administrative operations of the federal government. A presidential notice or a presidential sequestration order can also be issued.

Listed below are executive orders numbered 3416–3885 and presidential proclamations signed by United States President Warren G. Harding (1921–1923). He issued 522 executive orders. His executive orders are also listed on Wikisource, along with his presidential proclamations.

Signature of Warren G. Harding

== Executive orders ==
=== 1921 ===
Relative No.	Absolute No.	Title/Description	Date signed
1	3416	Authorizing Appointment of Miller W. Gieseking to Clerical Position in Classified Civil Service	March 4, 1921
2	3428	Addition to Quarry Heights Military Reservation	April 8, 1921
3	3434	Relating to Licensing of Vehicles, Road Rules, Use of Lights, Tags, and Signals, and Speed Regulations in the Canal Zone	April 14, 1921
4	3435	Diminishing Certain Lands of Crook National Forest, Arizona	April 15, 1921
5	3445	Extending Trust Period of Fond du Lac Reservation in Minnesota for Ten Years	April 30, 1921
6	3450	Withdrawing Lands in New Mexico to Determine Advisability for Inclusion in National Monument	May 3, 1921
7	3455	Concerning Appointments of Postmasters	May 10, 1921
8	3457	Amending the Executive Order of August 8, 1918, to Permit Temporary Stop-Overs at Ports of the United States Without the Requirement of Visaed Passports	May 12, 1921
9	3461	Revocation of Emergency War Orders	May 16, 1921
10	3474	Transferring Naval Petroleum Reserves in California and Wyoming, and Naval Shale Reserves in Colorado and Utah, to Interior Secretary Under Supervision of the President	May 31, 1921
11	3501	Amending Civil Service Rules Relating to Reinstatement	June 25, 1921
12	3513		July 9, 1921
13	3524	Directing that Designs for Medals, Coins, Etc., and Statues, Fountains, Monuments, Parks and Buildings in the District of Columbia be Submitted to the Commission of Fine Arts	July 28, 1921
14	3542	Revoking Executive Order of May 3, 1921, Temporarily Withdrawing Lands in New Mexico to Determine Advisability for Inclusion in National Monument	August 31, 1921
15	3543	Transferring Naval Hospital, Fort Lyon, Colo., to United States Veterans' Bureau	August 31, 1921
16	3546	Transferring Portion of Naval Hospital, Great Lakes, Ill., to United States Veterans' Bureau	October 10, 1921
17	3560	Concerning Civil Service Ratings for Presidential Postmaster Candidates who Served in the World War	October 14, 1921
18	3577	Prescribing the Manner of Dating Proclamations, Commissions and Similar Executive Documents	November 8, 1921
19	3578	Prescribing Regulations Governing the Preparation and Submission of the Budget and the Conduct of the Budget Bureau	November 8, 1921
20	3585	Conditions of Employment For Panama Canal Employees, Relating to Rent, Fuel, Electric Current, Water, and Services	December 3, 1921
21	3596	Setting Apart the Montana National Bison Range, Sullys Hill (N. Dak.) National Park Game Preserve, and Elk Refuge (Wyo.) as Bird Refuges	December 22, 1921
22	3597		December 24, 1921
23	3600	Prescribing Provisions for Temporary Operation of the Naba-Yap-Guam Cables Under Agreement With Japan	December 24, 1921
24	3601	Establishing the Purchasing Commission for Russian Relief, Appointing Membership of Same and for Other Purposes	December 24, 1921
25	3603	Prescribing Rules of Practice and Procedure of the United States District Court In and For the Canal Zone	December 30, 1921
26	3604-A	Amending Application Rules Governing the Granting and Issuance of Passports in the Philippines and Virgin Islands	December 31, 1921

=== 1922 ===
Relative No.	Absolute No.	Title/Description	Date signed
27	3605	Transferring Described Portions of Holy Cross National Forest to the White River National Forest, Colorado	January 3, 1922
28	3617	Reserving Land in Alaska for use in Administration of Mount McKinley National Park	January 13, 1922
29	3644	Withdrawing Certain Described Lands in Montana Pending Legislation	February 28, 1922
30	3650	Withdrawing Land in South Dakota for Classification and Pending Legislation for its Disposition	March 22, 1922
31	3668		April 29, 1922
32	3669	Establish Benefits for Veterans	April 29, 1922
33	3678	Reserving Lands on Kodiak Island, Alaska for the Use of the Department of Agriculture as An Addition to the U.S. Agriculture Experiment Station Situated Near Kodiak, Kodiak Island, Alaska, Created by Executive Order Dated 3/28/1898	May 20, 1922
34	3705	Revoking Executive Order No. 2658 of August 16, 1917 Reserving Certain Described Lands in Oklahoma for Possible Military Use and Placing Control of Said Lands Under the Department of the Interior for Disposal	July 1, 1922
35	3705-A		July 1, 1922
36	3705-B	Prescribing Regulations Governing Increased Pay for Duty Involving Flying for the Army, Navy, Marine Corps and Coast Guard	July 1, 1922
37	3706	Consolidating the Offices of Register and Receiver at the Del Norte and Sterling Land Offices in Colorado	July 10, 1922
38	3746	Directing All Requests and Petitions Under Tariff Act be Referred to United States Tariff Commission	October 7, 1922
39	3748	Withdrawing Land in South Dakota for Classification and Pending Legislation for its Disposition	October 23, 1922
40	3750	Amending of Prescribed Regulations Governing Increased Pay for Duty Involving Flying for the Army, Navy, Marine Corps and Coast Guard	October 30, 1922
41	3762	Authorizing the Rating of Prentice O'Rear's Examination Papers for Postmastership without Regard to the Provisions of Executive Order No. 3455 of May 10, 1921	December 9, 1922
42	3769	Removing Lands from Papago Saguaro National Monument	December 28, 1922
43	3770	Anna M. Curran Made Eligible for Appointment as Printer's Assistant in the Engraving and Printing Bureau, Treasury Dept. without Regard to Civil Service Rules	December 30, 1922
44	3770-A	Alien Property Custodian Authorized to Sell at Private Sale Certain Real Estate in San Francisco, California, the Property of Maria Hau, née Browning, of Sievern, Kreis Lehe, Germany	December 30, 1922

=== 1923 ===
Relative No.	Absolute No.	Title/Description	Date signed
45	3771	Executive Order No. 9 of Jan. 17, 1873, Prohibiting Federal Employees from Holding Any State, Territorial, County, or Municipal Government Office Amended to Permit Appointment as Special Agents in the Labor Dept. Any Person Holding State, Territorial, County, or Municipal Positions, When the Labor Sec'y Deems it Necessary in Order to Secure A More Efficient Administration of the Said Labor Dept.	January 2, 1923
46	3772	Mrs. Frank L. Scott Made Eligible for Appointment	January 8, 1923
47	3773	Federal Council of Citizenship Training Established and Duties Prescribed	January 12, 1923
48	3774	Transfer of Harbor Tug No. 68 from Navy Department to Shipping Board	January 12, 1923
49	3775	Withdrawing Certain Islands in Cross Lake, La., for Classification and Pending Legislation	January 12, 1923
50	3776	Authorizing the Rating of Examination Papers of James J. Dickerson for the Postmastership at Paris, Texas Without Regard for Age Limits	January 22, 1923
51	3777	Diminishing Certain Lands of Harney National Forest, South Dakota	January 22, 1923
52	3778	Modification of Executive Order No. 3644 of February 28, 1922 Withdrawing Certain Described Lands in Montana Pending Legislation	January 24, 1923
53	3779	Abolishing Customs Collection District No. 25 (San Diego) Consolidating with Customs Collection District No. 27 (Los Angeles)	January 26, 1923
54	3780	Authorizing the Rating of Examination Papers of Cornelius V. Collins for Postmastership at Troy, N.Y., without Regard to the Provisions of Executive Order No. 3455 of May 10, 1921	January 30, 1923
55	3781	Reserving Certain Described Lands in California for Use by Bureau of Mines	January 31, 1923
56	3797-A	Certain Described Petroleum Seepage Lands Along the Arctic Coast of Alaska Reserved As A Naval Petroleum Reserve	February 27, 1923
57	3800	Reserving Additional Lands for Administration of Mount McKinley National Park	March 2, 1923
58	3860		June 7, 1923
59	3885	Certain Right-of-Way and Three Tracts of Lands on Keaau Ridge, Kaena Point, and Puu-O-Hulu, Oahu, T. H., Reserved for Military Purposes	July 27, 1923

== Presidential proclamations ==
=== 1921 ===
Relative No.	Absolute No.	Title/Description	Date signed
1	1589	Reserving Biscayne Bay, Florida, Tract of Land for Coast Guard	March 11, 1921
2	1590	Convening Extra Session of Congress	March 22, 1921
3	1591	Enlarging Area of the Pisgah National Forest, North Carolina	March 25, 1921
4	1592	Appointing James C. Davis, Director General of Railroads	March 26, 1921
5	1593	Designating James C. Davis as Agent in Actions Arising Out of Federal Control of Transportation Systems etc.	March 26, 1921
6	1594	Designating Week of May 22–28, 1921, as Forest Protection Week	April 7, 1921
7	1595	Announcing Monday, May 30, 1921, a Day of Public Memorial	May 3, 1921
8	1596	Suspending Discriminating Duties on Vessels of Poland and Danzig	May 6, 1921
9	1597	Modifying Regulations for Protection of Migratory Birds	May 17, 1921
10	1598	Transferring Certain Lands to Porto Rico	May 19, 1921
11	1599	Diminishing Area of the Toiyabe National Forest, Nevada	May 25, 1921
12	1600	Enlarging Area of the Nezperce National Forest, Idaho	July 9, 1921
13	1601	Enlarging Area of the Wasatch National Forest, Utah	July 9, 1921
14	1602	Enlarging Area of the Lassen National Forest, California	July 18, 1921
15	1603	Modifying Area of the Plumas National Forest, California	July 18, 1921
16	1604	Diminishing Area of the Tahoe National Forest, California	July 18, 1921
17	1605	Extending Time for Payments on Ceded Crow Indian lands	August 11, 1921
18	1606	Commanding Persons Engaged in Insurrectionary Proceedings in West Virginia to Disperse	August 30, 1921
19	1607	Continuing Marine and Seaman's Division of Veterans Bureau Until December 31, 1921	September 1, 1921
20	1608	Setting Aside Addition to Muir Woods National Monument	September 22, 1921
21	1609	Designating October 10, 1921, as Fire Prevention Day	September 27, 1921
22	1610	Designating November 11, 1921, for Silent Prayer for Unidentified Dead Who Lost Their Lives in the World War	September 30, 1921
23	1611	Announcing Death of Senator Philander Chase Knox, Formerly Attorney General and Secretary of State	October 13, 1921
24	1612	Designating Thursday, November 24, 1921, as a Day of General Thanksgiving	October 31, 1921
25	1613	Declaring November 11, 1921, a Holiday to Commemorate Those Who Gave Their Lives in the World War	November 4, 1921
26	1614	Diminishing Area of the Columbia and Colville National Forests, Washington	November 4, 1921
27	1615	Enlarging Area of the Weiser National Forest, Idaho	November 19, 1921
28	1616	Urging Observance of American Educational Week	November 21, 1921
29	1617	Continuing Marine and Seaman's Division of Veterans Bureau Until June 30, 1922	December 14, 1921

=== 1922 ===
Relative No.	Absolute No.	Title/Description	Date signed
30	1618	Setting Aside the Lehman Caves National Monument, Nevada	January 24, 1922
31	1619	Extending Time for Establishing Shipping Service, etc., to Virgin Islands to May 1, 1922	February 1, 1922
32	1620	Diminishing Area of the Tongass National Forest, Alaska	February 7, 1922
33	1621	Prohibiting Illegal Shipment of Arms to China	March 4, 1922
34	1622	Prescribing Additional Regulations for Protection of Migratory Birds	March 8, 1922
35	1623	Suspending Discriminating Duties on Vessels of Germany	March 22, 1922
36	1624	Designating Week of April 16–22, 1922, as Forest Protection Week, etc.	March 31, 1922
37	1625	Enlarging Area of the Minidoka National Forest, Idaho and Utah	May 15, 1922
38	1626	Extending Time for Establishing Shipping Service to Virgin Islands to November 1, 1922	May 18, 1922
39	1627	Transferring Old Honolulu Post Office Site, etc., to Territory of Hawaii	May 25, 1922
40	1628	Copyright Benefits to Germany for Works Published Therein, etc., Since August 1, 1914, and Not in United States	May 25, 1922
41	1629	Copyright Benefits to Austria for Works Published Therein, etc., Since August 1, 1914, and Not in United States	May 25, 1922
42	1630	Copyright Benefits to New Zealand for Works Published Therein, etc., Since August 1, 1914, and Not in United States	May 25, 1922
43	1631	Copyright Benefits to Italy for Works Published Therein, etc., Since August 1, 1914, and Not in United States	June 3, 1922
44	1632	Copyright Benefits to Hungary for Works Published Therein, etc., Since August 1, 1914, and Not in United States	June 3, 1922
45	1633	Continuing Marine and Seaman's Division of Veterans Bureau Until June 30, 1923	June 30, 1922
46	1634	Modifying Boundaries of the Fillmore National Forest, Utah	July 10, 1922
47	1635	Extending Time for Paying Installments for Ceded Lands of Crow Indian Reservation, Montana	July 10, 1922
48	1636	Forbidding Interference with Interstate and Mail Transportation	July 11, 1922
49	1637	Authorizing Disposal of Surplus Coal in Alaska for Local Needs	July 26, 1922
50	1638	Reserving from Leases, etc., Additional Lands in Nenana Coal Field, Alaska	August 4, 1922
51	1639	Designating October 9, 1922, as Fire Prevention Day	September 16, 1922
52	1640	Setting Aside the Timpanogos Cave National Monument, Utah	October 14, 1922
53	1641	Setting Aside the Fossil Cycad National Monument, South Dakota	October 21, 1922
54	1642	Extending Time for Establishing Shipping Service to Virgin Islands to November 1, 1923	October 28, 1922
55	1643	Designating Thursday, November 30, 1922, as a Day of General Thanksgiving	November 2, 1922
56	1644	Convening Extra Session of Congress, November 20, 1922	November 9, 1922
57	1645	Setting Aside December 3–9, 1922, as American Education Week	November 20, 1922

=== 1923 ===
Relative No.	Absolute No.	Title/Description	Date signed
58	1646	Diminishing Area of the Rainier National Forest, Washington	January 10, 1923
59	1647	Suspending Discriminating Duties on Vessels of Austria	January 15, 1923
60	1648	Suspending Discriminating Duties on Vessels of Hungary	January 15, 1923
61	1649	Transferring Lands in San Juan to Porto Rico	January 22, 1923
62	1650	Setting Aside the Aztec Ruin National Monument, New Mexico	January 24, 1923
63	1651	Modifying Boundaries of the Lemhi National Forest Idaho	February 9, 1923
64	1652	Copyright Benefits to Netherlands Extended to Mechanical Musical Reproductions	February 26, 1923
65	1653	Setting Aside the Mound City Group National Monument, Ohio	March 2, 1923
66	1654	Setting Aside the Hovenweep National Monument, Utah-Colorado	March 2, 1923
67	1655	Enlarging Area of the Manzano National Monument, Arizona and New Mexico	March 3, 1923
68	1656	Designating Week of April 22–28, 1923, as Forest Protection Week, etc.	March 5, 1923
69	1657	Amending Regulations for Protection of Migratory Birds	April 10, 1923
70	1658	Diminishing Area of the Sequoia National Forest, California	May 7, 1923
71	1659	Enlarging Area of the Inyo National Forest, California	May 7, 1923
72	1660	Enlarging Area of the Pinnacles National Monument, California	May 7, 1923
73	1661	Enlarging Area of the Powell National Forest, Utah	May 17, 1923
74	1662	Directing Settlement for Losses on Certain Sugar Importations	May 23, 1923
75	1663	Setting Aside the Pipe Spring National Monument, Arizona	May 31, 1923
76	1664	Setting Aside the Bryce Canyon National Monument, Utah	June 8, 1923
77	1665	Prescribing Additional Regulations for Protection of Migratory Birds	June 11, 1923
78	1666	Continuing Marine and Seaman's Division of Veterans Bureau Until September 3, 1924	June 12, 1923
79	1667	Modifying Boundaries of the Carson National Forest, New Mexico	June 16, 1923
80	1668	Diminishing Area of the Santa Fe National Forest, New Mexico	June 16, 1923
