= Military fiat =

Military fiat is a process whereby a decision is made and enforced by military means without the participation of other political elements. The Latin term fiat, translated as "let it be done", suggests the autocratic attitude ascribed to such a process. For example, many coups involve the imposition of a new government by military fiat.

== See also ==
- Ecoregional democracy
- Fiat money
