= List of executive actions by Andrew Jackson =

Relative no.	Absolute no.	Title/Description	Date signed	Ref.
		Restricting access to pensions for disabilities	April 8, 1829	
		Pardoning deserters	June 12, 1830	
		Firing all clerks who were in debt	August 6, 1831	
		Commemorating the death of General Lafayette	June 21, 1834	
		Specie Circular	July 11, 1836	
		Countermand a requisition	August 7, 1836	
		Disapproval of Second Seminole War court of inquiry	February 15, 1837	
		Disapproval of Second Seminole War court of inquiry	February 18, 1837	
