= Presidential determination =

Presidential directive issued by the White House

A presidential determination is a kind of presidential directive issued by the White House stating a determination resulting in an official policy or position of the executive branch of the United States federal government. Presidential determinations may involve any number of actions, including setting or changing foreign policy, setting drug enforcement policy, or any number of other exercises of executive power.

One of the most famous presidential determinations was President Clinton's Presidential Determination 95–45, which exempted the US Air Force's facility in the vicinity of Groom Lake, Nevada (commonly called Area 51) from environmental disclosure laws, in response to subpoenas from a lawsuit brought by Area 51 workers alleging illegal hazardous waste disposal which resulted in injury and death. Subsequent to this determination, the lawsuit was dismissed due to lack of evidence.

A presidential determination is distinguished from an executive order, which is a specific directive issued by the President of the United States to part of the executive branch.

== See also ==
- List of United States federal executive orders
- Executive order (United States)
- Presidential proclamation (United States)
- Presidential memorandum
- National security directive
- Presidential finding
