= Presidential memorandum =

Directive issued by the President of the United States

Seal of the President of the United States

A presidential memorandum (from Latin memorare, 'to remember') is a type of directive issued by the president of the United States to manage and govern the actions, practices, and policies of the various departments and agencies found under the executive branch of the United States government. It has the force of law and is usually used to delegate tasks, direct specific government agencies to do something, or to start a regulatory process. There are three types of presidential memoranda: presidential determination or presidential finding, memorandum of disapproval, and hortatory memorandum.

Sometimes used interchangeably, an executive order is a more prestigious form of executive action that must cite the specific constitutional or statutory authority the president has to use it. Unlike executive orders, memoranda are not required by law to be published in the Federal Register, but publication is necessary in order to have "general applicability and legal effect". The Federal Register gives publication priority to executive orders and presidential proclamations over memoranda. Memoranda can be amended or rescinded by executive orders or another memorandum, but executive orders take legal precedence and cannot be changed by a memorandum.

== History ==
In the past, presidential memoranda have been referred to as presidential letters.

President	Number Issued
Barack Obama	644
Donald Trump (as of January 6, 2020)	167

== Presidential determination ==
Presidential determination, or presidential finding, are memoranda required by a statute and must be issued before certain actions are taken. For example, a presidential determination on the status of a country must be released before sanctions are imposed on the country.

== Memorandum of disapproval ==
A memorandum of disapproval is a public veto statement.

== Hortatory memorandum ==
A hortatory memorandum is issued as a broad policy statement, but unlike a presidential proclamation is directed to executive agencies.

== National security presidential memorandum ==
In 2017, President Donald Trump issued the national security directives under the name of "national security presidential memorandums". They operate like executive orders, but are only in the area of national security. They date back to President Harry S. Truman and have been issued by various presidents under different names.

== See also ==
- Executive order (United States)
- Presidential directive
- Presidential proclamation
- Memorandum of conversation
