= List of executive actions by Herbert Hoover =

The president of the United States may take any of several kinds of executive actions.

Executive orders are issued to help officers and agencies of the executive branch manage the operations within the federal government itself. Presidential memoranda are closely related, and have the force of law on the Executive Branch, but are generally considered less prestigious. Presidential memoranda do not have an established process for issuance, and unlike executive orders, they are not numbered. A presidential determination results in an official policy or position of the executive branch of the United States government. A presidential proclamation is a statement issued by a president on a matter of public policy, under specific authority granted to the president by Congress, typically on a matter of widespread interest. Administrative orders are signed documents such as notices, letters, and orders, that can be issued to conduct administrative operations of the federal government. A presidential notice or a presidential sequestration order can also be issued.

Listed below are executive orders numbered 5076–6070 and presidential proclamations signed by United States President Herbert Hoover (1929–1933). He issued 1011 executive orders. His executive orders are also listed on Wikisource.

Signature of Herbert Hoover

== Executive orders ==
=== 1929 ===
Relative No.	Absolute No.	Title/Description	Date signed
1	5076	Designating Mrs. Helen V. McLeod, Clerk in the Interior Department, to Sign President's Name to Land Patents	Mar 07
2	5077	Designating Mrs. Viola B. Pugh, Clerk in the Interior Department, to Sign President's Name to Land Patents	Mar 07
3	5078	Designating Lincoln, Nebraska as a Customs Port of Entry	Mar 12
4	5079	Publication of Internal Revenue Tax Refund Decisions	Mar 14
5	5080	Transferring Lands from Missoula National Forest, Montana to Helena National Forest, Montana	Mar 19
6	5081	Abolishing Roche Harbor, Washington, as a Customs Port of Entry in Custom Collection District No. 30	Mar 22
7	5082	Reserving Certain Described Lands in Oregon for Classification and Pending Legislation	Mar 22
8	5083	Approving Recommendation for Reinstatement of Mrs. Emma E. Kennedy Without Regard to Civil Service Rules	Mar 22
9	5084	Suspending Age Limit Requirement for Mrs. Lessie L. Schaefer to Permit Examination	Mar 23
10	5085	Reserving Certain Described Lands in Wyoming for Resurvey	Mar 28
11	5086	Restoring Certain Reserved Lands in New Mexico Pending Resurvey and Such Lands Opened to Entry	Mar 30
12	5087	Extension of Trust Period on Allotments Made to Certain Indians of the Siletz Reservation in Oregon	Apr 01
13	5088	Directing Certain Appropriations for Virgin Islands be Accredited to and Expended by the Governor	Apr 08
14	5089	Reserving Certain Described Lands in Colorado for Resurvey	Apr 09
15	5090	Restoring Certain Reserved Lands in Wyoming Pending Resurvey and Such Lands Opened to Entry	Apr 09
16	5091	Reserving Certain Described Lands in New Mexico for Resurvey	Apr 09
17	5092	Modifying Boundaries of Crook National Forest, Arizona	Apr 09
18	5093	Approving Recommendation for Appointment of Mrs. Ida Strong Without Regard to Civil Service Rules	Apr 09
19	5094	Approving Recommendation for Appointment of Mr. William A. Kennedy Without Regard to Civil Service Rules	Apr 12
20	5095	Reserving Certain Described Lands in Alaska for Agricultural Experimentation Station Purposes and for Establishment of Nunivak Island Reservation	Apr 15
21	5096	Extending Port Limits of Boston, Massachusetts for Customs Port of Entry Purposes	Apr 19
22	5097	Permitting the Leasing of Certain Lands Reserved to Department of Commerce for Lighthouse Purposes in Alaska by the Department of Interior for Farming Purposes	Apr 20
23	5098	Reserving Certain Described Lands in Wyoming for Resurvey	Apr 23
24	5099	Ordering Rates of Rental and Subsistence Allowances of Officers of the Various Services into Effect	Apr 23
25	5100	Approving Recommendation for Appointment of Mrs. Jean N. Edington Without Regard to Civil Service Rules	Apr 23
26	5101	Approving Recommendation for Appointment of Mrs. Mary Elizabeth Porterfield Without Regard to Civil Service Rules	Apr 29
27	5102	Restoring Certain Reserved Lands in Alaska Withdrawn for the Extension of Chugach National Forest	Apr 30
28	5103	Approving Recommendation for Appointment of Mrs. Lottie C. Meyer Without Regard to Civil Service Rules	May 1
29	5104	Prescribing Regulations Governing the Appointment of Postmasters of the 1st, 2nd and 3rd Class	May 1
30	5105	Reserving Certain Described Lands in Nevada for Possible Inclusion in a National Monument	May 3
31	5106	Restoring Certain Described Lands Reserved for Operation of Public Water Reserve No. 107 in Alaska	May 4
32	5107	Amending Civil Service Rules, Schedule A	May 8
33	5108	Reserving Certain Described Lands in Washington for Lookout Station Purposes	May 10
34	5109	Reserving Certain Described Lands in Colorado for Resurvey	May 13
35	5110	Amending Consular Regulations	May 13
36	5111	Amending Civil Service Rules, Regulation VIII Pertaining to Reinstatement	May 13
37	5112	Approving Recommendation for Appointment of Mrs. Juliette V. Harring Without Regard to Civil Service Rules	May 14
38	5113	Approving Recommendation for Appointment of Mrs. Marie Crossette Without Regard to Civil Service Rules	May 14
39	5113-A	Delegating Further Authority to the Alien Property Custodian Under the Trading with the Enemy Act	May 14
40	5114	Designating Horace Paul Bestor as Commissioner of the Federal Farm Loan Board	May 15
41	5115	Reserving Certain Described Lands in Oregon for Resurvey	May 15
42	5116	Reserving Certain Described Lands in Arkansas for Resurvey	May 15
43	5117	Reserving Certain Described Lands in California Pending Authorization for Sale to Los Angeles for Protection of Their Watershed	May 16
44	5118	Reserving Certain Described Lands in Oregon for Lookout Station Purposes	May 16
45	5119	Reserving Certain Described Lands in Hawaii for Military Purposes	May 17
46	5120	Reserving Certain Described Lands in New Mexico Pending Archaeological Investigation by the Smithsonian Institution	May 17
47	5121	Reserving Certain Described Lands in California for Resurvey	May 18
48	5122	Establishing Fort Keogh Bird Refuge, Montana	May 18
49	5123	Amending Civil Service Rules, Schedule A, Subdivision IX	May 21
50	5124	Amending Civil Service Rules, Schedule A, Subdivision I, Paragraph 6	May 23
51	5125	Reserving Certain Described Lands in Alaska for Railroad Purposes	May 23
52	5126	Amending Instructions to Diplomatic Officers of 1927 Pertaining to Leave of Absence	May 24
53	5127	Amending Consular Regulations	May 24
54	5128	Approving Recommendation for Appointment of Mr. Joeseph B. White Without Regard to Civil Service Rules	May 27
55	5129	Reserving Certain Described Lands in Philippine Islands for Military Purposes	May 28
56	5130	Extension of Customs Collection District No. 20 to Include Portions of Plaquemines Parish, New Orleans	May 29
57	5131	Approving Recommendation for Appointment of Mr. George Henry Malone Without Regard to Civil Service Rules	May 31
58	5132	Restoring Certain Reserved Lands in Hawaii Withdrawn for Kahuaiki [Fort Shafter] Military Reservation to Territory of Hawaii Government	Jun 06
59	5133	Exemption Hon. Percy W. Phillips from Civil Service Rules Prohibiting Federal Employees from Holding Office Under State, Territorial, or Municipal Government	Jun 07
60	5134	Approving Recommendation for Appointment of Mrs. Mary V. Kehoe Without Regard to Civil Service Rules	Jun 12
61	5135	Approving Recommendation for Appointment of Mr. Walter K. Liscombe Without Regard to Civil Service Rules	Jun 12
62	5136	Amending Alaska Railroad Townsite Regulations	Jun 12
63	5137	Carbury, N. Dakota, Creation as a Customs Port of Entry	Jun 17
64	5138	Reserving Certain Described Lands in Wisconsin for Classification and Pending Legislation	Jun 17
65	5139	Reserving Certain Described Lands in Philippine Islands for Naval Reservations	Jun 19
66	5140	Reserving Certain Described Lands in Wyoming for Resurvey	Jun 20
67	5141	Reserving Certain Described Lands in Nevada for Classification as to Suitability for a Game Refuge	Jun 20
68	5142	Approving Recommendation for Reinstatement of Mr. Ralph Ely Stedman Without Regard to Civil Service Rules	Jun 20
69	5143	Restricting for the Time Being the Transportation of Passengers From Certain Ports in the Orient to a United States Port	Jun 21
70	5144	Reserving Certain Described Lands in New Mexico for Resurvey	Jun 25
71	5145	Approving Recommendation for Appointment of Mrs. Ida A. Coffey Without Regard to Civil Service Rules	Jun 29
72	5146	Approving Recommendation for Appointment of Mrs. Edna May Without Regard to Civil Service Rules	Jun 29
73	5147	Coronado National Forest, Arizona, revocation of order establishing Huachuca District	Jul 01
74	5148	Extension of Trust Period on Allotments Made to Indians on the Omaha Reservation in Nebraska	Jul 03
75	5149	Approving Recommendation for Reinstatement of Mrs. Frances D. Haldeman Without Regard to Civil Service Rules	Jul 05
76	5150	Approving Recommendation for Reinstatement of Mrs. Mae A. Krigbaum Without Regard to Civil Service Rules	Jul 05
77	5151	Amending Executive Order No. 1713 of February 24, 1913, Reserving Certain Described Islands in Washington for Public Purposes	Jul 30
78	5151-A	Providing Further Assignment of Frequencies to Government Radio Stations	Jul 08
79	5152	Approving Recommendation for Reinstatement of Mrs. Lulu M. Davis in the Bureau of Engraving and Printing Without Regard to Length of Separation from Service	Jul 08
80	5153	Amending Civil Service Rule IX, Reinstatement	Jul 09
81	5154	Approving Recommendation for Reinstatement of Mrs. Birdie E. Gordon Without Regard to Civil Service Rules	Jul 09
82	5155	Restoring a Portion of Fort DeRussy Military Reservation, Hawaii, for Widening Ena Road	Jul 11
83	5156	Designating Hon. Harvey M. Hutchison as Acting Judge of the District Court of the United States for Porto Rico	Jul 11
84	5157	Restoring Certain Reserved Lands in Hawaii Withdrawn for Punchbowl Hill Military Reservation to Territory of Hawaii Government	Jul 13
85	5158	Establishing Cedar Keys Bird Refuge, Florida	Jul 16
86	5159	Reidsville, N.C., creation as a customs port of entry	Jul 18
87	5160	Restoring Certain Reserved Lands in Oregon and California, Withdrawn for Railway Grants to Permit Use in Maintenance of Air Navigation Facilities	Jul 19
88	5161	Approving Recommendation for Appointment of Mr. Louis Bulicek Without Regard to Civil Service Rules	Jul 23
89	5162	Restoring Certain Reserved Lands in Wyoming Withdrawn for Airplane Landing Field	Jul 24
90	5163	Authorizing Appointment of Mr. Howard Fyfe to Classified Status as Assistant Despatch Agent, U.S. Despatch Agency, New York	Jul 25
91	5164	Approving Recommendation for Appointment of Mr. James Lawrence Bent Without Regard to Civil Service Rules	Jul 25
92	5165	Reserving Certain Described Lands in Colorado for Resurvey	Jul 26
93	5166	Reserving Certain Described Lands in California for Resurvey	Jul 26
94	5167	Approving Recommendation for Appointment of Mr. Robert F. Kerkam Without Regard to Civil Service Rules	Jul 29
95	5168	Approving Recommendation for Appointment of Mrs. Myrtle B. Shely Without Regard to Civil Service Rules	Jul 29
96	5169	Abolishing Souris, N. Dakota as a Customs Port of Entry	Aug 07
97	5170	Amending Civil Service Rules, Schedule B	Aug 08
98	5171	Amending Civil Service Rules, Schedule A and Schedule B	Aug 08
99	5172	Reserving Certain Described Lands in Montana for Resurvey	Aug 09
100	5173	Extension of Trust Period on Allotments Made to Indians on the Yankton Sioux Reservation in South Dakota	Aug 09
101	5174	Amending Executive Order No. 4679 of June 29, 1927, Describing the Boundaries of Pupukea Military Reservation, Territory of Hawaii	Aug 21
102	5175	Approving Recommendation for Appointment of Mrs. Marjorie M. Noone Without Regard to Civil Service Rules	Aug 21
103	5176	Reserving Certain Described Lands in Oregon for Classification and Pending Legislation	Aug 23
104	5177	Restoring Certain Reserved Lands in New Mexico Pending Resurvey and Opening Such Lands to Entry	Aug 23
105	5178	Restoring Certain Reserved Lands in New Mexico Pending Resurvey and Opening Such Lands to Entry	Aug 28
106	5179	Restoring Certain Reserved Lands in New Mexico Pending Resurvey and Opening Such Lands to Entry	Aug 28
107	5180	Approving Recommendation for Appointment of Mrs. Jeanette C. Vaughan Without Regard to Civil Service Rules	Aug 29
108	5181	Restoring Certain Reserved Lands in Wyoming Pending Resurvey and Opening Such Lands to Entry	Aug 29
109	5182	Reserving Certain Described Lands in California and Nevada for Classification	Aug 29
110	5183	Restoring Certain Reserved Lands in Wyoming Pending Resurvey and Opening Such Lands to Entry	Aug 30
111	5184	Restoring Certain Reserved Lands in Wyoming Pending Resurvey and Opening Such Lands to Entry	Sep 06
112	5185	Establishing Colon Naval Radio Station, Canal Zone	Sep 06
113	5186	Approving Recommendation for Appointment of Mrs. Ida Elizabeth Henning Without Regard to Civil Service Rules	Sep 07
114	5187	Exempting Census Supervisors from Civil Service Rules Prohibiting Federal Employees from Holding Office Under State, County, or Municipal Government	Sep 09
115	5188	Exempting Indian Service Employees from Civil Service Rules Prohibiting Federal Employees from Holding Office Under State, County, or Municipal Government	Sep 10
116	5189	Prescribing Regulations Governing the Administration of the Foreign Service	Sep 11
117	5190	Reserving Certain Described Lands in Oregon for Classification and Pending Legislation	Sep 11
118	5191	Restoring Certain Reserved Lands in Florida Withdrawn for Classification and Legislation to Permit Homestead Entry	Sep 13
119	5192	Abolishing Lewiston, New York, as a Customs Port of Entry	Sep 14
120	5193	Extending Limits of Customs Ports of Entry of Astoria, Portland, and Marshfield, Oregon, and Longview, Washington, for Incorporation in Customs Collection District No. 29 [Oregon]	Sep 14
121	5194	Reserving Certain Described Lands in Arkansas for Classification	Sep 16
122	5195	Restoring Certain Reserved Lands in Colorado Pending Resurvey and Opening Such Lands to Entry	Sep 16
123	5196	Reserving Certain Described Lands in Oregon for Fire Patrol Headquarters Purposes	Sep 21
124	5197	Restoring Certain Reserved Lands in California and Nevada Withdrawn for Power Site Reserve No. 421	Sep 21
125	5197-A	Assigning Radio Frequencies to Government Radio Stations	Sep 30
126	5198	Amending Civil Service Rules, Schedule A, Subdivision IX	Sep 30
127	5199	Restoring Certain Portions of Tongass National Forest, Alaska, for Entry Purposes	Oct 01
128	5200	Transferring the Division of Cooperative Marketing to the Federal Farm Board	Oct 01
129	5201	Reserving Certain Described Lands in Colorado for Classification and Pending Advisability to Add to Hovenweep National Monument	Oct 03
130	5202	Reserving Certain Described Lands in California for Resurvey	Oct 07
131	5203	Reserving Certain Described Lands in Oregon for Classification and Pending Legislation	Oct 08
132	5204	Approving Recommendation for Appointment of Mrs. Mrs. Estelle Roberts Without Regard to Civil Service Rules	Oct 09
133	5205	Approving Recommendation for Appointment of Mr. Erwin G. May Without Regard to Civil Service Rules	Oct 09
134	5206	Oroville, Washington, Creation as a Customs Port of Entry	Oct 11
135	5207	Restoring Certain Reserved Lands Along the Unalaklik River and On Norton Bay in Alaska and Opening Such Lands to Entry	Oct 12
136	5208	Reserving Certain Described Lands in Nevada for Resurvey	Oct 12
137	5209	Approving Recommendation for Appointment of Mrs. Giulia P. Burke Without Regard to Civil Service Rules	Oct 12
138	5210	Approving Recommendation for Appointment of Mrs. Josephine Jackley Without Regard to Civil Service Rules	Oct 17
139	5211	Reserving Certain Described Lands in Maryland for Airspace Reservation Purposes	Oct 19
140	5212	Restoring Certain Reserved Lands in Washington for Resurvey and Opening Such Lands to Entry	Oct 25
141	5213	Amending Civil Service Rules, Schedule A, Subdivision VIII	Oct 28
142	5214	Reserving Certain Described Lands in Alaska for Naval Purposes	Oct 30
143	5215	Restoring Certain Reserved Lands in Wyoming Pending Resurvey and Opening Such Lands to Entry	Nov 01
144	5216	Restoring Certain Reserved Lands in South Dakota for Resurvey and Opening Such Lands to Entry	Nov 02
145	5217	Restoring Certain Reserved Lands for Public Water Reserves in Washington and Such Lands Restored to Public Domain	Nov 04
146	5218	Reserving Certain Described Lands in California for Resurvey	Nov 04
147	5219	Reserving Certain Described Lands in Alaska for Alaska Reindeer Service Purposes	Nov 05
148	5220	Provisions for Uniform Style and Safeguarding of Proclamations and Executive Orders	Nov 08
149	5221	Civil Service Rules, limitation of non-official employment of officers or employees of Federal Government	Nov 11
150	5222	California, land withdrawal pending authorization for sale to the city of Napa for protection of their watershed	Nov 12
151	5223	Restoring Certain Reserved Lands for Air Navigation Facilities in Idaho and Opening Such Lands to Entry	Nov 12
152	5224	Approving Recommendation for Appointment of Mrs. Alice Tasker Without Regard to Civil Service Rules	Nov 15
153	5225	Approving Recommendation for Appointment of Mrs. Eliza C. O'Reilly Without Regard to Civil Service Rules	Nov 15
154	5226	Prescribing Regulations Governing Diplomatic Visas in the Foreign Service	Nov 18
155	5227	Restoring Certain Reserved Lands Occupied as a Home Site or for Fish Cannery Purposes in Tongass National Forest, Alaska and Opening Such Lands to Entry	Nov 18
156	5228	Establishing Benton Lake Bird Refuge, Montana	Nov 21
157	5229	Reserving Certain Described Lands in California Pending Authorization of Sale to City of Los Angeles for Water Supply System Purposes	Nov 25
158	5230	Amending Civil Service Rules, Schedule A	Nov 25
159	5231	Approving Recommendation for Appointment of Mrs. Germaine M. Finley Without Regard to Civil Service Rules	Nov 25
160	5232	Approving Recommendation for Appointment of Mrs. Maude Williams Without Regard to Civil Service Rules	Nov 25
161	5233	Reserving Certain Described Lands in California Pending Authorization of Sale to City of Napa for Watershed Protection Purposes	Dec 04
162	5234	Reserving Certain Described Lands in New Mexico for Resurvey	Dec 04
163	5235	Approving Recommendation for Reinstatement of Mrs. Marguerite Barrette Without Regard to Civil Service Rules	Dec 06
164	5236	Amending Civil Service Rules, Schedule A	Dec 09
165	5237	Reserving Certain Described Lands in California for Classification	Dec 10
166	5238	Christmas, 1929	Dec 12
167	5239	Expenditures in Connection With Oil Lands on Former Naval Reserves	Dec 12
168	5240	Correcting the Description of Pupukea Military Reservation, Territory of Hawaii	Dec 14
169	5241	Reserving Certain Described Lands in Colorado for Resurvey	Dec 16
170	5242	Designating Clarence M. Young as Acting Secretary of Commerce	Dec 16
171	5243	Restoring Certain Reserved Lands Affecting Amaknak Island, Alaska, and Opening Such Lands to Entry	Dec 19
172	5244	Reserving Certain Described Lands in Washington for Use as an Administrative Site for the Columbia National Forest	Dec 23
173	5245	Wyoming, authorization to permit a gas pipeline right-of-way within Power Site Reserve No. 36	Dec 23
174	5246	Utah, authorization to permit a gas pipeline right-of-way within Power Site Reserve No. 377	Dec 23
175	5247	Edwin V. Morgan, retention as Ambassador Extraordinary and Plenipotentiary to Brazil	Dec 23
176	5248	Amending Civil Service Rules, Schedule B	Dec 28
177	5249	Reserving Certain Described Lands in Michigan for Classification and Pending Inclusion in a National Forest	Dec 31
178	5250	Establishing a Pardon Board for the Panama Canal Zone	Dec 31
179	5251	Reserving Certain Described Lands in Colorado for Target Range Purposes	Dec 31
180	5252	Restoring Certain Reserved Lands Withdrawn for Petroleum Reserve No. 61, Colorado No. 2, to Public Domain	Dec 31
181	5253	Extension of Trust Period on Allotments Made to Indians of the Omaha Reservation, Nebraska	Dec 31
182	5254	Restoring Certain Reserved Lands for Target Range Purposes in New Mexico and Opening Such Lands to Entry	Dec 31
183	5255	Reserving Certain Described Lands in New Mexico for National Guard Use as a Target Range	Dec 31

=== 1930 ===
Relative No.	Absolute No.	Title/Description	Date signed
184	5256	Commutation of Rations and Quarters for Enlisted Men of the Various Services	Jan. 03
185	5257	Colorado, Land Withdrawal for Target Range	Jan. 09
186	5258	North Dakota, Land Withdrawal for Classification and Pending Legislation	Jan. 09
187	5259	Mrs. Mary Bernadine Partridge, Exemption From Civil Service Rules on Appointment	Jan. 10
188	5260	Alaska, Formation of A Commission for the More Economical and Effective Conduct of Business	Jan. 10
189	5261	New Mexico, Land Withdrawal for Resurvey	Jan. 20
190	5262	Arizona, Revocation of Lands Withdrawn for Resurvey and Such Lands Opened To Entry	Jan. 20
191	5263	Alien Property Custodian, Authorization to Sell Certain Stocks of the United States Metals Refining Co.	Jan. 22
192	5264	Parrots, Restriction on the Importation Into the U.S.	Jan. 24
193	5265	Hawaii, Restoration of Portion of Punchbowl Hill Military Reservation	Jan. 24
194	5266	Hawaii, Restoration of Portion of Fort Ruger Military Reservation	Jan. 24
195	5267	Judge James Waldron Remick, War Claims Arbiter, Establishment of Salary	Jan. 25
196	5268	Bureau of Lighthouses, Department of Commerce, Inclusion in the Board of Surveys and Maps	Jan. 25
197	5269	Jan Jose T. Casanovas, Exemption From Civil Service Rules on Appointment	Feb. 01
198	5270	Colorado, Land Withdrawal for Public Water Reserve	Feb. 04
199	5271	Colorado, Restoration of Lands Withdrawn for Power Site Reserve No. 81	Feb. 07
200	5272	New Mexico, Restoration of Lands Withdrawn for Public Water Reserve No. 50, New Mexico No. 3	Feb. 07
201	5273	New Mexico, Land Withdrawal for Public Water Reserve No. 129, New Mexico No. 13	Feb. 07
202	5274	Utah, Land Withdrawal for Public Water Reserve No. 127, Utah No. 19	Feb. 07
203	5275	Utah, Land Withdrawal for Possible Inclusion in Zion National Park	Feb. 07
204	5276	New Mexico, Land Withdrawal for Possible Inclusion in a National Monument	Feb. 07
205	5277	Idaho, Land Withdrawal for An Agricultural Experimentation Station	Feb. 07
206	5278	Florida, Land Withdrawal for Possible Inclusion in a National Forest	Feb. 07
207	5279	Utah, Revocation of Lands Withdrawn for Classification	Feb. 08
208	5280	Montana, Land Withdrawal for An Addition to Deep Creek Ranger Station for the Administration of Helena National Forest	Feb. 17
209	5281	Airspace Reservations, Establishment	Feb. 17
210	5282	Louisiana, Land Withdrawal for Possible Inclusion in a National Monument	Feb. 19
211	5283	Mrs. Mabel V. Birch, Exemption From Civil Service Rules on Appointment	Feb. 21
212	5284	Port Pierce, Florida, Designation As A Customs Port of Entry	Feb. 21
213	5285	Eustaquio Vallecer, Exemption From Civil Service Rules on Classification	Feb. 25
214	5286	H. Percival Dodge, Exemption From Civil Service Rules on Appointment	Feb. 25
215	5287	Nevada, Land Withdrawal for Resurvey	Feb. 25
216	5288	Commutation of Rations and Quarters for Enlisted Men of the Various Services	Feb. 26
217	5289	Alaska, Reservation of Lands for Educational Purposes	Mar. 04
218	5290	Consular Regulations, Amendment	Mar. 05
219	5291	New Bern and Manteo, N.C., Customs Ports of Entry Abolished	Mar. 05
220	5292	Nevada, Land Withdrawal for Public Water Reserve No. 130, Nevada No. 21	Mar. 05
221	5293	Montana, Restoration of Lands Withdrawn for Public Water Reserve No. 51	Mar. 05
222	5294	Nevada, Restoration of Lands Withdrawn for Resurvey, These Lands Restored to Dixie National Forest	Mar. 05
223	5295	Instructions to Diplomatic Officers, Amendment	Mar. 06
224	5296	Wyoming, Restoration of Lands Withdrawn for the Extension of Yellowstone National Forest, These Lands Restored to Targhee National Forest	Mar. 08
225	5297	Colorado, Land Withdrawal for Resurvey	Mar. 10
226	5298	Panama Canal Zone, Motor Vehicles Licensing	Mar. 10
227	5299	Prairie Band of Potawatomi Indians, Kansas, Extension of Trust Period on Allotments	Mar. 10
228	5300	New Mexico, Land Withdrawal for Resurvey	Mar. 11
229	5301	Crow Indian Reservation, Montana, Extension of Trust Period on Allotments	Mar. 12
230	5302	Rosebud Indian Reservation, South Dakota, Extension of Trust Period on Allotments	Mar. 12
231	5303	Devils Lake Indian Reservation, North Dakota, Extension of Trust Period on Allotments	Mar. 12
232	5304	Colorado, Land Withdrawal for Resurvey	Mar. 14
233	5305	Nez Perce Indian Reservation, Idaho, Extension of Trust Period on Allotments	Mar. 18
234	5306	Seneca Indian Tribe, Okla., Extension of Trust Period on Allotments	Mar. 18
235	5307	Fishlake National Forest, Utah, Enlargement	Mar. 20
236	5308	Philippine Islands, Land Withdrawal for Military Purposes	Mar. 20
237	5309	Minnesota, Land Withdrawal for Resurvey	Mar. 24
238	5310	H. Charles Spruks, Exemption From Civil Service Rules on Appointment	Mar. 25
239	5311	Mrs. Mabel P. Hollister, Exemption From Civil Service Rules on Appointment	Mar. 25
240	5312	Idaho, Restoration of Lands Withdrawn for Power Site Reserves	Mar. 26
241	5313	Oregon, Land Withdrawal Pending Legislation	Mar. 26
242	5314	Salt Plains Wildlife Refuge, Okla., Establishment	Mar. 26
243	5315	New Mexico, Land Withdrawal for Resurvey	Mar. 26
244	5316	Wolf Island Wildlife Reserve, Ga., Establishment	Apr. 03
245	5317	New Bern and Manteo, N.C., Revocation of Order Abolishing Them as Customs Ports of Entry	Apr. 03
246	5318	Aleutian Islands Reservation, Alaska, Enlargement	Apr. 07
247	5319	California, Land Withdrawal Pending Authorization for Sale to Los Angeles for Protection of Their Watershed	Apr. 07
248	5320	Niagara Falls, N.Y., Extension of Port Limits to Include Lewiston, N.Y.	Apr. 07
249	5321	Commerce Department, Inspection of Income Tax Returns	Apr. 08
250	5322	San Luis, Arizona, Designation as a Customs Port of Entry	Apr. 09
251	5323	Wyoming, Land Withdrawal for Resurvey	Apr. 10
252	5324	Leopoldville, Belgian Congo, Designation as an "Unhealthful" Foreign Service Post	Apr. 10
253	5325	Mrs. Liza B. Moncure, Exemption From Civil Service Rules on Appointment	Apr. 12
254	5326	California, Withdrawal of Islands Pinnacles and Rock for Classification and Pending Legislation	Apr. 14
255	5327	Oil Shale Deposits, Land Withdrawal for Investigation, Examination, and Classification	Apr. 15
256	5328	Colorado, Land Withdrawal for Resurvey	Apr. 15
257	5329	Mrs. Laura Mac Decker, Exemption From Civil Service Rules on Appointment	Apr. 16
258	5330	Mrs. Helen Laddbush, Exemption From Civil Service Rules on Appointment	Apr. 16
259	5331	California, Land Withdrawal for Town Site Purposes	Apr. 17
260	5332	Assistant Secretaries of War, Order of Precedence	Apr. 22
261	5333	Miss Mary Edwina Coons, Exemption From Civil Service Rules on Appointment	Apr. 22
262	5334	Mrs. Selma F. Dinger, Exemption From Civil Service Rules on Appointment	Apr. 22
263	5335	Mrs. Thelma D. Roy, Exemption From Civil Service Rules on Appointment	Apr. 22
264	5336	Utah, Restoration of Lands Withdrawn for Classification As Coal Lands	Apr. 23
265	5337	Army Rations, Limitations Changed	Apr. 23
266	5338	Lt. Ewile K. Jett, Andrew D. Ring, and Eugene Cogley, Exemption From Civil Service Rules on Appointment	Apr. 23
267	5339	Arizona and Nevada, Land Withdrawal for Classification and Possible Inclusion in a National Monument	Apr. 25
268	5340	Mrs. Ida K. Marsh, Exemption From Civil Service Rules on Appointment	Apr. 25
269	5341	Arizona, Land Withdrawal for Resurvey	May 2
270	5342	Arkansas, Land Withdrawal for Resurvey	May 6
271	5343	Nevada, Land Withdrawal for Resurvey	May 6
272	5344	Montana, Nevada, Oregon, and Utah, Land Withdrawal for Public Water Reserve No. 131	May 8
273	5345	Consular Regulations, Amendment	May 8
274	5346	Minnesota, Land Withdrawal for Resurvey	May 9
275	5347	Florence R. Hopkins, Exemption From Civil Service Rules on Appointment	May 12
276	5348	Mrs. Helen Hall York, Exemption From Civil Service Rules on Appointment	May 12
277	5349	Bird Island Wildlife Refuge, Utah, Establishment	May 12
278	5350	San Diego and Imperial Counties, California, Formation of Customs Collection District No. 25	May 22
279	5351	Florida, Restoration of Lands Withdrawn for Phosphate Reserve No. 16	May 23
280	5352	Alaska, Land Withdrawal for An Agricultural Experimentation Station	May 23
281	5353	Closing of Government Departments and Agencies in the District of Columbia, May 31, 1930	May 27
282	5354	Wyoming, Land Withdrawal for Resurvey	May 27
283	5355	Rates of Rental and Subsistence Allowances for Officers of the Various Services	May 28
284	5356	Prairie Band of Potawatomi Indians, Kansas, Extension of Trust Period on Allotments	May 28
285	5357	Uncompahgre, Uintah, and White River Bands of Ute Indians, Utah, Extension of Trust Period on Allotments	May 29
286	5358	Committee on the Administration and Conservation of the Public Domain, Funds Disbursement	June 3
287	5359	Alaska, Coal Lands Withdrawal	June 3
288	5360	Oregon, California, and Idaho, Restoration of Lands Withdrawn for Power Site Reserves	June 3
289	5361	Alaska, Land Withdrawal for Use by the Alaska Road Commission	June 4
290	5362	California, Land Withdrawal for Protection of Hot Springs	June 4
291	5363	Montana, Restoration of Lands Withdrawn for Power Site Reserve No. 397	June 4
292	5364	Alaska, Land Withdrawal for Naval Purposes	June 5
293	5365	Alaska, Land Withdrawal for Vocational Training of Inhabitants	June 10
294	5366	Michigan, Restoration of Lands Withdrawn to Permit A Homestead Entry by Joseph S. Cooper	June 13
295	5367	Idaho, Restoration of Lands Withdrawn for Power Site Reserves No. 132 and 513	June 14
296	5368	Michigan, Restoration of Lands Withdrawn for Resurvey, and Such Lands Restored to Huron National Forest	June 16
297	5369	Panama Canal Zone, Cerro Tigre Ordnance Depot Military Reservation, Establishment	June 16
298	5370	New Mexico, Land Withdrawal for Classification	June 17
299	5371	Assistant Secretaries of War, Order of Precedence	June 19
300	5372	Oregon, Restoration of Lands Withdrawn for Power Site Reserves	June 20
301	5373	Virgin Islands, Appropriations Accredited to Governor	June 20
302	5374	Mrs. Mary R. Martin, Exemption From Civil Service Rules on Appointment	June 20
303	5375	Minidoka Bird Reservation, Idaho, Enlargement	June 23
304	5376	International Joint Commission, American Members, Fixing of Salary Rate	June 23
305	5377	Miss Patia Smith, Exemption From Civil Service Rules on Appointment	June 23
306	5378	Alaska, Restoration of Lands Withdrawn for Power Site Reserve No. 460	June 24
307	5379	Arizona, California, and Colorado, Restoration of Lands Withdrawn for Public Water Reserves	June 24
308	5380	California, Land Withdrawal Pending Authorization for Sale to Los Angeles for Protection of Their Watershed	June 24
309	5381	Panama Canal Zone, Hotel Tivoli, Transfer of Operations From the Panama Canal Zone to the Panama Railroad Co.	June 24
310	5382	Panama Canal Zone, Authorization for the Paymaster to Advance Funds to Bonded Employees	June 24
311	5383	Red Lake Indian Reservation, Minnesota, Trust Period Extension on Allotments	June 26
312	5384	Reservation of Certain Described Lands at Fort Yukon, Alaska, for Use by the Alaska Game Commission	June 27
313	5385	St. Michael, Alaska, Customs Port of Entry Abolished	June 27
314	5386	Michigan, Restoration of Lands Withdrawn for Classification to Permit Selection of Lands by the State	July 2
315	5387	Mrs. Mildred E. Vincent, Exemption From Civil Service Rules on Appointment	July 2
316	5388	Civil Service Rules, Schedule A, Subdivision VIII, Amendment	July 2
317	5389	United States, Land Withdrawal Containing Medicinal Springs	July 2
318	5390	Mrs. A. Louise Gilbert, Exemption From Civil Service Rules on Appointment	July 7
319	5391	Alaska, Reservation of Lands for Educational Purposes	July 8
320	5392	Customs Collection District No. 21 Texas, Extension of Limits to Include Cameron and Calcasieu Counties in Louisiana and the Customs Station of Lake Charles, La., in Customs Collection District No. 20	July 9
321	5393	Idaho, Restoration of Lands Withdrawn for Power Site Reserve No. 406	July 10
322	5394	Hon. Pedro De Aldrey, Designation As Acting Judge for the District Court of the United States for Puerto Rico	July 14
323	5395	Colorado, Land Withdrawal for Resurvey	July 16
324	5396	Disabled Veterans, Special Leaves of Absence for Medical Treatment	July 17
325	5397	Washington, Land Withdrawal for Lookout Station	July 18
326	5398	Veterans' Administration, Formation From the Consolidation of the United States Veterans' Bureau, Bureau of Pensions, and the National Home for Disabled Volunteer Soldiers	July 21
327	5399	Mrs. Bell Scarburgh Joynes, Exemption From Civil Service Rules on Appointment	July 22
328	5400	Foreign Service, Regulations Governing Representation Allowances	July 22
329	5401	California, Land Withdrawal to Protect the Los Angeles Water Supply System	July 23
330	5402	Chugach National Forest, Alaska, Revocation of Lands Used for Fish Cannery Purposes and Such Lands Opened To Entry	July 24
331	5403	California, Restoration of Lands Withdrawn for Power Site Reserve No. 316	July 25
332	5404	Crook National Forest, Arizona, Land Withdrawal for Township Purposes	July 25
333	5405	Hawaii, Restoration of Lands From Puolo Point Military Reservation	July 29
334	5406	Hawaii, Restoration of Lands From Upolu Point Military Reservation	July 29
335	5407	Oregon and Wyoming, Land Withdrawal for Public Water Reserve No. 132	July 25
336	5408	California, Land Withdrawal for Possible Inclusion in a National Monument	July 25
337	5409	Tongass National Forest, Alaska, Lands Excluded From, and Such Lands Opened To Entry	July 28
338	5410	Utah, Revocation of Lands Withdrawn for Resurvey and Such Lands Opened To Entry	July 29
339	5411	Wyoming, Revocation of Lands Withdrawn for Resurvey and Such Lands Opened To Entry	July 29
340	5412	New Mexico, Revocation of Lands Withdrawn for Resurvey and Such Lands Opened To Entry	July 29
341	5413	Wyoming, Revocation of Lands Withdrawn for Resurvey and Such Lands Opened To Entry	July 29
342	5414	Hawaii, Waiariae-kai Military Reservation, Correction of Land Description	July 31
343	5415	Kickapoo Indians, Kansas, Extension of Trust Period on Allotments	Aug. 04
344	5416	Klamath River Indian Reservation, California, Extension of Trust Period on Allotments	Aug. 04
345	5417	Consular Regulations, Amendment	Aug. 04
346	5418	Colorado, Revocation of Lands Withdrawn for Resurvey and Such Lands Opened To Entry	Aug. 04
347	5419	Ketchikan Radio Station, Alaska, Establishment	Aug. 05
348	5420	Colorado, Revocation of Lands Withdrawn for Resurvey and Such Lands Opened To Entry	Aug. 05
349	5421	New Mexico, Revocation of Lands Withdrawn for Resurvey and Such Lands Opened To Entry	Aug. 05
350	5422	Colorado, Revocation of Lands Withdrawn for the O'Connor Ranger Station and Such Lands Opened To Entry	Aug. 07
351	5423	New Mexico, Revocation of Lands Withdrawn for Resurvey and Such Lands Opened To Entry	Aug. 08
352	5424	Colorado, Land Withdrawal for Classification and Pending Legislation	Aug. 15
353	5425	Tongass National Forest, Alaska, Exclusion of Lands From, and Such Lands Used for Town Site Purposes	Aug. 20
354	5426	Aliens, Documents Required Upon Entry Into the United States	Aug. 20
355	5427	Nonimmigrants, Waiver Or Reduction of Application and Visa Fees	Aug. 20
356	5428	Montana, Land Withdrawal for Classification	Aug. 20
357	5429	Army and Navy General Hospital, Hot Springs, Arkansas, Rates for Medical Care	Aug. 25
358	5430	Montana, Restoration of Lands Withdrawn for Power Site Reserve No. 36	Aug. 26
359	5431	Mrs. Robert D. Freeman, Exemption From Civil Service Rules on Appointment	Aug. 27
360	5432	California, Restoration of Lands Withdrawn for Public Water Reserve No. 14	Aug. 28
361	5433	Montana, Revocation of Lands Withdrawn Pending Legislation and Such Lands Opened To Entry	Aug. 28
362	5434	Montana, Revocation of Lands Withdrawn for Classification and Such Lands Opened To Entry	Aug. 28
363	5435	Diplomatic Visas for Reentry Into the United States	Sept 02
364	5436	Wyoming, Land Withdrawal for Classification and Pending Legislation	Sept 02
365	5437	Mrs. Frances Kearney, Exemption From Civil Service Rules on Appointment	Sept 04
366	5438	Arizona, Land Withdrawal for Classification and Pending Legislation	Sept 05
367	5439	Tongass National Forest, Alaska, Exclusion of Lands From, and Such Lands Opened To Entry	Sept 05
368	5440	Utah, Revocation of Lands Withdrawn for Resurvey and Such Lands Opened To Entry	Sept 05
369	5441	Alaska, Reservation of Lots in Nenana for the Alaska Railroad	Sept 08
370	5442	Mrs. James R. Bennett, Exemption From Civil Service Rules on Appointment	Sept 11
371	5443	California, Restoration of Lands Withdrawn for Power Site Reserve No. 364	Sept 12
372	5444	Lawrence, Mass., Designation As A Customs Port of Entry	Sept 16
373	5445	Marshfield, Oregon, Extension of Port Limits	Sept 16
374	5446	California, Revocation of Lands Withdrawn for Resurvey and Such Lands Opened To Entry	Sept 18
375	5447	Alaska, Reservation of Lots in Seward for the Agriculture Department	Sept 22
376	5448	Arkansas, Restoration of Lands Withdrawn for Power Site Reserve No. 514	Sept 23
377	5449	Tongass National Forest, Alaska, Exclusion of Lands From, and Such Lands Opened To Entry	Sept 25
378	5450	Alaska, Land Withdrawal for A Radio Station for the Washington-Alaska Military Cable and Telegraph System	Sept 25
379	5451	Oregon, Land Withdrawal for Lookout Station	Sept 25
380	5452	New Mexico, Land Withdrawal for Resurvey	Sept 25
381	5453	Wichita, Kansas, Designation As A Customs Port of Entry	Sept 25
382	5454	Utah, Restoration of Lands Withdrawn for Power Site Reserves No. 1, 174, and 235	Sept 30
383	5455	Customs Collection District No. 8 New York, Extension of Limits	Oct. 01
384	5456	Utah, Restoration of Lands Withdrawn for Power Site Reserve No. 393	Oct. 01
385	5457	Alaska, Restoration of Lands Withdrawn on Amaknak Island	Oct. 01
386	5458	Alaska, Amendment of Land Description for Lands Withdrawn for Lighthouse Purposes	Oct. 01
387	5459	Shipping Commissioner, Position Placed in the Classified Service	Oct. 04
388	5460	Colorado, Restoration of Lands Withdrawn for Petroleum Reserve No. 61	Oct. 08
389	5461	Alaska, Restoration of Lands Withdrawn for Power Site Reserve No. 491	Oct. 14
390	5462	Arizona, Lands Withdrawn for Customs and Immigration Inspection Purposes	Oct. 14
391	5463	Instructions to Diplomatic Officers, Amendment	Oct. 15
392	5464	Plant Patents, Agriculture Department Required to Make Available All Information and Such Employees As Needed for the Consideration of Patents by the Commissioner of Patents	Oct. 17
393	5465	California, Land Withdrawal for An Addition to Benicia Arsenal Military Reservation	Oct. 20
394	5466	Chippewa Indians, Minnesota, Extension of Trust Period on Allotments	Oct. 22
395	5467	California, Restoration of Lands Withdrawn for Reservoir Site Reserve No. 17	Oct. 22
396	5468	Instructions to Diplomatic Officers, Inventory of Government Property	Oct. 22
397	5469	Consular Regulations, Amendment	Oct. 22
398	5470	Nunivak Island Reservation, Alaska, Enlargement	Oct. 22
399	5471	Civil Service Rules, Schedule A, Subdivision VII, Amendment	Oct. 24
400	5472	California, Land Withdrawal to Protect the Los Angeles Water Supply	Oct. 27
401	5473	Personnel Classification Board, Authority and Procedures for Making Changes in the Allocation of Positions	Oct. 30
402	5474	Niobraro Or Santee Indian Reservation, Nebr., Extension of Trust Period on Allotments	Oct. 31
403	5475	Lake Charles, Louisiana, Designation As A Customs Port of Entry	Nov. 03
404	5476	War Department, Duties and Functions Performed for Veterans Transferred to the Veterans' Administration	Nov. 04
405	5477	Utah, Authorization for the Uinta Pipe Line Co. to Run Telephone and Telegraph Lines Across Power Site Reserve No. 377	Nov. 04
406	5478	California, Montana, New Mexico, and Oregon, Land Withdrawal for Public Water Reserve No. 133	Nov. 08
407	5479	Civil Service Rule X, Section 6, Amendment	Nov. 11
408	5480	Wyoming, Land Withdrawal for Classification and Pending Legislation	Nov. 13
409	5481	Idaho, Land Withdrawal for Agricultural Experimentation Purposes	Nov. 14
410	5482	Idaho, Land Withdrawal Pending Legislation	Nov. 14
411	5483	New Mexico, Land Withdrawal for Resurvey	Nov. 14
412	5484	New Mexico, Land Withdrawal for Resurvey	Nov. 14
413	5485	New Mexico, Revocation of Lands Withdrawn for Resurvey	Nov. 14
414	5486	Oregon, Restoration of Lands Withdrawn for Power Site Reserves No. 285, 661, and 664 and Power Site Classification No. 164, Oregon No. 17	Nov. 14
415	5487	Hawaii, Fort Armstrong Military Reservation, Correction of Land Description	Nov. 14
416	5488	Colorado, Revocation of Lands Withdrawn for Resurvey and Such Lands Opened To Entry	Nov. 15
417	5489	California, Land Withdrawal for Public Water Reserve No. 134	Nov. 15
418	5490	Montana, Restoration of Lands Withdrawn for Power Site Reserve No. 47	Nov. 15
419	5491	District of Columbia, Civil Service Commission, Authorization to Maintain A List of Eligibles for Vacancies in the Municipal Government	Nov. 18
420	5492	Colorado, Restoration of Lands Withdrawn for Public Water Reserve No. 62	Nov. 18
421	5493	Philippine Islands, Restoration of Portion of Augur Barracks Military Reservation	Nov. 18
422	5494	Washington, Revocation of Lands Withdrawn for Resurvey and Such Lands Opened To Entry	Nov. 18
423	5495	Wyoming, Land Withdrawal for Public Water Reserve No. 136	Nov. 22
424	5496	Nevada, Revocation of Lands Withdrawn for Public Water Reserve No. 29, Nevada No. 1	Nov. 22
425	5497	New Mexico, Restoration of Lands Withdrawn for Power Site Reserve No. 547	Nov. 24
426	5498	Salton Sea Wildlife Refuge, California, Establishment	Nov. 25
427	5499	Utah, Revocation of Lands Withdrawn for Coal Lands Classification, Utah No. 1 and Utah No. 12	Nov. 28
428	5500	Alaska, Land Withdrawal for the Alaska Road Commission	Dec. 02
429	5501	Mrs. Eva Macfate, Exemption From Civil Service Rules on Reinstatement	Dec. 02
430	5502	Virgin Islands, Regulations Governing the Dispensation of Narcotic Drugs	Dec. 02
431	5503	Mrs. Pearl Mclntosh, Exemption From Civil Service Rules on Appointment	Dec. 04
432	5504	Idaho, Land Withdrawal for Target Range	Dec. 04
433	5505	Mississippi, Lands Transferred to the Jurisdiction of the Secretary of the Interior	Dec. 08
434	5506	Colorado, Revocation of Lands Withdrawn for Resurvey and Such Lands Opened To Entry	Dec. 08
435	5507	Paducah, Kentucky, Customs Port of Entry Abolished	Dec. 08
436	5508	Utah, Land Withdrawal for Classification and Purposes of Flood Control	Dec. 10
437	5509	New Mexico, Revocation of Lands Withdrawn for Resurvey and Such Lands Opened To Entry	Dec. 10
438	5510	Wyoming, Restoration of Lands Withdrawn for Power Site Reserve No. 5	Dec. 10
439	5511	Louisiana, Land Withdrawal for Classification and Possible Inclusion in a National Forest	Dec. 11
440	5512	California, Land Withdrawal for the Protection of the Los Angeles Water Supply System	Dec. 11
441	5513	Civil Service Rules, Schedule B, Subdivision X, Amendment	Dec. 13
442	5514	Christmas, 1930	Dec. 15
443	5515	Utah, Revocation of Lands Withdrawn for Bird Island Wildlife Refuge	Dec. 15
444	5516	Umatilla Indian Reservation, Oregon, Extension of Trust Period on Allotments	Dec. 17
445	5517	Chugach National Forest, Alaska, Exclusion of Lands From, and Such Lands Opened To Entry	Dec. 17
446	5518	New Mexico, Revocation of Lands Withdrawn for Resurvey and Such Lands Opened To Entry	Dec. 19
447	5519	Robert Peet Skinner, Retention in the Foreign Service As Envoy Extraordinary and Plenipotentiary to Greece	Dec. 23
448	5520	Mrs. Lulie Hunt Turnipseed, Exemption From Civil Service Rules on Appointment	Dec. 23
449	5521	Hawaii, Restoration of Portion of Fort Shatter and Hawaii Arsenal Military Reservations	Dec. 31
450	5522	Arizona, Land Withdrawal for Classification and Pending Legislation	Dec. 31
451	5523	Mr. John W. Martyn, Inclusion in the Classified Service	Dec. 31

=== 1931 ===
Relative No.	Absolute No.	Title/Description	Date signed
452	5524	Colorado, Revocation of Lands Withdrawn for Resurvey and Such Lands Opened to Entry	Jan. 05
453	5525	Utah, Land Withdrawal for Classification and Pending Legislation	Jan. 05
454	5526	Consular Regulations, Amendment	Jan. 07
455	5527	Mildred Barnes Mcinturff, Exemption from Civil Service Rules on Appointment	Jan. 07
456	5528	Hawaii, Restoration of Portion of Upolu Airplane Field	Jan. 07
457	5529	Leafie E. Dietz, Designation to Sign Land Patents	Jan. 08
458	5530	Two Harbors, Minnesota, Customs Port of Entry Abolished	Jan. 09
459	5531	New Mexico, Land Withdrawal for Resurvey	Jan. 13
460	5532	Washington, Federal Power Commission, Authorization to Issue a Permit for a Project on Reservoir Site Reserve No. 1	Jan. 15
461	5533	Oregon, Federal Power Commission, Authorization to Issue a Project License to the Odell Lake Co. for Construction on Reservoir Site Reserve No. 16	Jan. 16
462	5534	Montana and Nevada, Land Withdrawal for Public Water Reserve No. 137	Jan. 21
463	5535	Montana, Restoration of Lands Withdrawn for Power Site Reserve No. 510	Jan. 21
464	5536	Montana, Restoration of Lands Withdrawn for Power Site Reserve No. 397	Jan. 21
465	5537	California, Restoration of Lands Withdrawn for Potash Reserve No. 2, California No. 1	Jan. 21
466	5538	Colorado, Land Withdrawal for Resurvey	Jan. 23
467	5539	Ponca Indian Reservation, Oklahoma, Extension of Trust Period on Allotments	Jan. 23
468	5540	Charles Sheldon Wildlife Refuge, Nevada, Establishment	Jan. 26
469	5541	Oregon, Restoration of Lands Withdrawn for Power Site Reserves	Jan. 27
470	5542	California, Land Withdrawal for Resurvey	Jan. 27
471	5543	Idaho, Restoration of Lands Withdrawn for Power Site Reserve No. 283	Jan. 30
472	5544	Civil Service Rules, Schedule A, Subdivision III, Amendment	Jan. 30
473	5545	Civil Service Rules, Schedule B, Subdivision I, Paragraph 7, Revocation	Jan. 30
474	5546	Cheyenne River Indian Reservation, South Dakota, Extension of Trust Period on Allotments	Jan. 31
475	5547	New Mexico, Land Withdrawal for Resurvey	Jan. 31
476	5548	New Mexico, Land Withdrawal for Resurvey	Jan. 31
477	5549	Instructions to Diplomatic Officers, Amendment	Feb. 05
478	5550	California, Land Withdrawal for Classification and in Aid of the Administration and Control of the Government-owned Oil and Gas Deposits in Kettleman Hills Field	Feb. 06
479	5551	New Mexico, Land Withdrawal for Resurvey	Feb. 07
480	5552	Utah, Revocation of Lands Withdrawn Containing Oil Shale to Permit the Issuance of Trust Patents to Ma-chook-a-rats chester and Jimmie Colorow, Uncompahgre Ute Indians	Feb. 09
481	5553	Mrs. Nixon S. Plummer, Exemption from Civil Service Rules on Appointment	Feb. 09
482	5554	Helen R. Witt, Exemption from Civil Service Rules on Appointment	Feb. 09
483	5555	New Mexico, Land Withdrawal for Resurvey	Feb. 11
484	5556	Prairie Band of Pottawatomie Indians, Kansas, Extension of Trust Period on Allotments	Feb. 11
485	5557	Pine Ridge Indian Reservation, South Dakota, Extension of Trust Period on Allotments	Feb. 13
486	5558	New Mexico, Land Withdrawal for Resurvey	Feb. 16
487	5559	Colorado, Land Withdrawal Pending Legislation to Make Such Land Grants to the Colorado School of Mines	Feb. 16
488	5560	Civil Service Rules, Schedule A, Amendment	Feb. 16
489	5561	Hawaii, Restoration of Lands Withdrawn for a United States Agricultural Station	Feb. 18
490	5562	Mississippi, Land Withdrawal for Lighthouse Purposes	Feb. 20
491	5563	Margaret Kane, Exemption from Civil Service Rules on Appointment	Feb. 23
492	5564	Oregon, Restoration of Lands Withdrawn for Power Site Reserves No. 145 and 566	Feb. 25
493	5565	Foreign Service, Regulations Governing Appointments	Feb. 25
494	5566	Placing the Government of the Virgin Islands under the Supervision of the Department of the Interior	Feb. 27
495	5567	Montana, Restoration of Lands Withdrawn for Power Site Reserve No. 512	Feb. 28
496	5568	Chugach National Forest, Alaska, Exclusion of Lands from, and Such Lands Opened to Entry	Mar. 03
497	5569	Florida, Revocation of Lands Withdrawn for Survey and Such Lands Opened to Entry	Mar. 03
498	5570	Civil Service Rule IX, Section 1, Amendment	Mar. 03
499	5571	Arizona, Land Withdrawal for Resurvey	Mar. 05
500	5572	Idaho, Authorization to Approve L. E. Strout's Application for Right-of-way for an Irrigation Project Across Lands Withdrawn for Classification	Mar. 07
501	5573	Utah, Land Withdrawal for Classification and Possible Inclusion in a National Monument	Mar. 07
502	5574	Chugach National Forest, Alaska, Exclusion of Lands from, and Such Lands Opened to Entry	Mar. 11
503	5575	Fond Du Lac Band of Chippewa Indians, Minnesota, Extension of Trust Period on Allotments	Mar. 12
504	5576	New Mexico, Revocation of Lands Withdrawn for Resurvey and Such Lands Opened to Entry	Mar. 13
505	5577	Oakland, California, Customs Port of Entry Abolished	Mar. 13
506	5578	Port of San Francisco, California, Designation Changed to the Port of San Francisco-Oakland and Extension of Port Limits	Mar. 13
507	5579	Crescent Lake Wildlife Refuge, Nebraska, Establishment	Mar. 16
508	5580	Agua Caliente Band of Mission Indians, California, Extension of Trust Period on Allotments	Mar. 16
509	5581	California, Land Withdrawal for Classification and Pending Legislation	Mar. 17
510	5582	Alaska, Land Withdrawal for the Investigation, Examination, and Classification of Coal Lands	Mar. 18
511	5583	Rates of Rental and Subsistence Allowances for Officers of the Various Services	Mar. 30
512	5584	Civil Service Rules, Schedule A, Section VIII, Paragraph 5d, Amendment	Mar. 30
513	5585	California, Land Withdrawal for Resurvey	Mar. 30
514	5586	North Dakota, Land Withdrawal for Classification and Possible Inclusion in a Wildlife Refuge	Mar. 30
515	5587	Colorado, Revocation of Lands Withdrawn for Resurvey and Such Lands Opened to Entry	Mar. 30
516	5588	Civil Service Rules, Schedule A, Amendment	Mar. 31
517	5589	Idaho, Land Withdrawal for Town Site Purposes	Apr. 01
518	5590	Montana, Restoration of Lands Withdrawn for Petroleum Reserve No. 40, Montana No. 1	Apr. 01
519	5591	Grace Mcmahan Tyndall, Exemption from Civil Service Rules on Appointment	Apr. 01
520	5592	Wyoming, Lands, Transfer of Jurisdiction from the Interior Department to the War Department	Apr. 03
521	5593	Colorado, Land Withdrawal for Public Water Reserve No. 139	Apr. 04
522	5594	Nevada and Wyoming, Land Withdrawal for Public Water Reserve No. 138	Apr. 06
523	5595	Memorial Flag Display for the Hon. Nicholas Longworth	Apr. 09
524	5596	Nevada, Land Withdrawal for Resurvey	Apr. 09
525	5597	New Mexico, Restoration of Lands Withdrawn for Public Water Reserve No. 86	Apr. 09
526	5598	New Mexico, Restoration of Coal Land Withdrawal, New Mexico No. 6	Apr. 10
527	5599	Capt. Washington C. Mccoy, Inclusion in the Classified Service	Apr. 13
528	5600	Oregon, Land Withdrawal for an Agricultural Field Station	Apr. 16
529	5601	Oregon, Land Withdrawal for Classification and Pending Legislation	Apr. 16
530	5602	Virgin Islands, Government Property, Placing Under the Control of the Interior Department	Apr. 20
531	5603	Wyoming, Land Withdrawal for Resurvey	Apr. 20
532	5604	Cecil Alexander, Exemption from Civil Service Rules on Appointment	Apr. 20
533	5605	Revocation of Rules Governing Actual Expense and Per Diem Allowances for Civilian Officers and Employees While Traveling, Effective July 1, 1931	Apr. 21
534	5605-A	Radio Frequencies, Assignment to Government Radio Stations	Apr. 21
535	5606	Fallen Wildlife Refuge, Nevada, Establishment	Apr. 22
536	5607	Hawaii, Lands Restored from Kahauiki and Hawaii Arsenal Military Reservations, Correction of Land Descriptions	Apr. 22
537	5608	Sasabe, Arizona, Designation as a Customs Port of Entry	Apr. 22
538	5609	National Home for Disabled Volunteer Soldiers, Former Employees, Now Employees of the Veterans' Administration, Inclusion in the Classified Service	Apr. 23
539	5610	Civil Service Rules, Veteran's Preference, Amendment	Apr. 24
540	5611	Arizona, Land Withdrawal for San Carlos Irrigation Project	Apr. 24
541	5612	Council of Personnel Administration, Establishment	Apr. 25
542	5613	Hawaii, Land Withdrawal for an Addition to Bishops Point Military Reservation	Apr. 28
543	5614	Government Budget, Regulations Governing the Reporting of Expenditures by the Treasury Department	May 1
544	5615	Idaho, Transfer of Lands from St. Joe to Clearwater National Forest	May 1
545	5616	Idaho and Montana, Transfer of Lands Between Pend Oreille and Kootenai National Forests	May 2
546	5617	Elsie K. Demshock, Exemption from Civil Service Rules on Appointment	May 4
547	5618	Crook National Forest, Arizona, Exclusion of Lands from, and for Town Site Purposes	May 11
548	5619	Deerlodge National Forest, Montana, Exclusion of Lands from, and Such Lands Opened to Entry	May 11
549	5620	Dorothy I. Sinnott, Exemption from Civil Service Rules on Appointment	May 13
550	5621	Consular Regulations, Amendment	May 13
551	5622	Philippine Islands, Federal Employees, Inclusion in the Classified Service	May 15
552	5623	California, Land Withdrawal for Resurvey	May 15
553	5624	Foreign Service Quarters, Regulations for the Occupation and Maintenance	May 15
554	5625	Interior Department, Field Service, Saturday Working Hours	May 18
555	5626	Kickapoo Indians, Kansas, Extension of Trust Period on Allotments	May 18
556	5627	Federal Employees Residing in Arlington, Va., Permission to Participate in Local Government	May 20
557	5628	Amy Cowing, Exemption from Civil Service Rules on Appointment	May 20
558	5629	Montana, Land Withdrawal for Public Water Reserve No. 141	May 21
559	5630	Washington, Lands Transferred from the Jurisdiction of the Navy Department to the Interior Department and Reservation of Part of the Lands for Lighthouse Purposes	May 25
560	5631	California, Land Withdrawal for Municipal Water Supply Purposes	May 26
561	5632	North Dakota, Revocation of Lands Withdrawn for Classification and Such Lands Opened to Entry	May 27
562	5633	California, Land Withdrawal for Resurvey	May 28
563	5634	Washington, Transfer of Lands from Mount Baker National Forest to Snoqualmie National Forest	June 1
564	5635	Arthur B. Landt, Exemption from Civil Service Rules on Appointment	June 2
565	5636	Civil Service Rules, Schedule B, Amendment	June 3
566	5637	Hawaii, Restoration of Portion of Keaahala Military Reservation	June 4
567	5638	Radio Frequencies, Assignment to Government Radio Stations	June 8
568	5638-A	Radio Frequencies, Assignment to Government Radio Stations	June 8
569	5639	Wyoming, Coal Land Withdrawal, Wyoming No. 1, Modification to Permit the Withdrawal of Lands for an Aviation Field	June 8
570	5640	California, Land Withdrawal for Resurvey	June 8
571	5641	Alaska, Restoration of Lands from Salmon Hatchery Reservation	June 8
572	5642	Foreign Service, Regulations for Administering	June 8
573	5643	Foreign Service, Representation and Post Allowances, Regulations Governing	June 8
574	5644	Foreign Service, Designation of "Unhealthful" Posts	June 8
575	5645	Alien Property Custodian, Delegation of Further Powers Under the Trading with the Enemy Act	June 8
576	5646	Idaho, Transfer of Lands from Selway National Forest to Bitterroot National Forest	June 9
577	5647	Income Tax Returns, Inspection	June 9
578	5648	Foreign Service, Regulations Governing Accounts and Returns	June 11
579	5649	Helen Terrill Mays, Exemption from Civil Service Rules on Appointment	June 12
580	5650	Oregon, Land Withdrawal for Public Water Reserve No. 142	June 18
581	5651	Minnesota, Revocation of Lands Withdrawn for Classification and Such Lands Opened to Entry	June 18
582	5652	Colorado, Land Withdrawal for Resurvey	June 18
583	5653	Colorado, Restoration of Lands Withdrawn for Power Site Reserve No. 81	June 20
584	5654	Montana, Land Withdrawal for an Addition to Duck Creek Ranger Station for the Administration of Helena National Forest	June 20
585	5655	Arizona, Restoration of Lands Withdrawn for Public Water Reserve No. 72	June 22
586	5656	Wyoming, Land Withdrawal for Resurvey	June 22
587	5657	Civil Service Rules, Schedule A, Subdivision II, Paragraph 2, Amendment	June 24
588	5658	Regulations Governing Form, Style, and Safeguarding of the Text of Executive Orders and Proclamations	June 24
589	5659	Florence R. Hopkins, Exemption from Civil Service Rules on Appointment	June 25
590	5660	Nevada, Lands, Transfer of Jurisdiction from the Navy Department to the Interior Department	June 26
591	5661	Consular Regulations, Amendment	July 1
592	5662	Civil Service Rules, Schedule A, Subdivision IX, Amendment	July 1
593	5663	Horace Paul Bestor, Designation as a Farm Loan Commissioner	July 1
594	5664	Nevada, Land Withdrawal for Use as a Naval Ammunition Depot	July 2
595	5665	A. D. Forsythe, Exemption from Civil Service Rules on Appointment	July 2
596	5666	Commerce Department, Persons Holding Local Offices, Permission to Receive an Appointment in the Commerce Department	July 3
597	5667	Oregon, Land Withdrawal for Resurvey	July 6
598	5668	Wyoming, Land Withdrawal for Target Range	July 6
599	5669	Montana and Utah, Restoration of Lands Withdrawn for Public Water Reserve No. 49, Montana No. 4 and Public Water Reserve No. 1, Utah No. 1	July 14
600	5670	Oregon, Transfer of Lands from the War Department to Suislaw National Forest	July 22
601	5671	Wisconsin, Minnesota, North Dakota, Montana, Wyoming, Idaho, Washington, and Oregon, Land Withdrawal Pending Legislation	July 29
602	5672	Colorado and Wyoming, Land Withdrawal for Public Water Reserve No. 143	Aug. 03
603	5673	Tongass National Forest, Alaska, Exclusion of Lands from, and Such Lands Opened to Entry	Aug. 04
604	5674	California, Revocation of Lands Withdrawn for Resurvey and Such Lands Opened to Entry	Aug. 07
605	5675	Utah, Revocation of Lands Withdrawn for Resurvey and Such Lands Opened to Entry	Aug. 07
606	5676	Washington, Reservoir Site Reserve No. 1, Modification, Federal Power Commission, Authorization to Issue a Project License	Aug. 07
607	5677	New Mexico, Revocation of Lands Withdrawn for Resurvey and Such Lands Opened to Entry	Aug. 10
608	5678	Utah, Revocation of Lands Withdrawn for Resurvey and Such Lands Opened to Entry	Aug. 10
609	5679	Wyoming, Revocation of Lands Withdrawn for Resurvey and Such Lands Opened to Entry	Aug. 10
610	5680	Civil Service Rule II, Schedule A, Subdivision VIII, Section 3, Amendment	Aug. 10
611	5681	California, Land Withdrawal for Resurvey	Aug. 12
612	5682	New Mexico, Land Withdrawal for Resurvey	Aug. 12
613	5683	Oregon, Land Withdrawal for Lookout Station	Aug. 12
614	5684	Utah, Land Withdrawal for Classification	Aug. 12
615	5685	New Mexico, Revocation of Lands Withdrawn for Resurvey and Such Lands Opened to Entry	Aug. 12
616	5686	California, Reservoir Site Reserve No. 17, Modification, Federal Power Commission, Authorization to Issue a Project License	Aug. 12
617	5687	Wyoming, Land Withdrawal for Resurvey	Aug. 18
618	5688	Colorado, Revocation of Lands Withdrawn for Resurvey and Such Lands Opened to Entry	Aug. 18
619	5689	Arizona, Authorization for Western Gas Co. to Run a Natural Gas Pipeline Within the United States-Mexico International Boundary Strip	Aug. 18
620	5690	Philippine Islands, Land Withdrawals in the Provinces of Zambales and Luzon for Chromite Deposits	Aug. 20
621	5691	Civil Service Rules, Schedule A, Subdivision XVIII, Amendment	Aug. 21
622	5692	Hawaii, Aiea Military Reservation, Amendment of Land Description	Aug. 24
623	5693	Hawaii, Punchbowl Hill Military Reservation, Correction of Land Description	Aug. 24
624	5694	Oregon, Land Withdrawal Pending Legislation	Aug. 25
625	5695	Marie V. Abernethy, Exemption from Civil Service Rules on Appointment	Aug. 27
626	5696	Civil Service Rules, Schedule B, Subdivision IV, Amendment	Aug. 27
627	5697	Caroline J. Skilton, Exemption from Civil Service Rules on Appointment	Aug. 28
628	5698	Colorado, Revocation of Lands Withdrawn for Resurvey and Such Lands Opened to Entry	Aug. 31
629	5699	Oregon, Revocation of Lands Withdrawn for Resurvey and Such Lands Opened to Entry	Aug. 31
630	5700	Public Health Service Officers, Permission to Hold Territorial, Local, and State Offices and Territorial, Local, and State Health Officer and Employees Permission to Hold Office in the Public Health Service Upon Approval or Necessity	Aug. 31
631	5701	John W. Harrison, Exemption from Civil Service Rules on Appointment	Aug. 31
632	5702	Oregon, Land Withdrawal for a Sea Lion Refuge	Sept 01
633	5703	Wyoming, Restoration of Lands Withdrawn for Power Site Reserve No. 137	Sept 01
634	5704	Panama Canal Zone, Delimiting of Judicial Districts	Sept 02
635	5705	Adolph G. Wolf, Designation as Acting Judge of the District Court of the United States for Porto Rico	Sept 03
636	5706	Mary J. A. Hangliter, Margaret B. Hillyard, Catherine Lehmkuhl, and Frances N. Kane, Exemption from Civil Service Rules on Appointments	Sept 04
637	5707	Foreign Service Quarters, Regulations Governing Occupation and Maintenance	Sept 04
638	5708	Uintah Railway Co., Authorization for a Right-of-way Across Certain Withdrawn Lands in Utah	Sept 08
639	5709	California, Land Withdrawal for Resurvey	Sept 11
640	5710	Naval Airspace and Defensive Sea Areas, Reservation for National Defense and Other Governmental Purposes	Sept 14
641	5711	Montana, Land Withdrawal for Classification and Pending Legislation	Sept 14
642	5712	Arizona, Land Withdrawal Pending Legislation	Sept 14
643	5713	Wyoming, Coal Land Withdrawal, Wyoming No. 1, Modification to Permit the Withdrawal and Use of Lands for the Maintenance of Air Navigation Facilities	Sept 14
644	5714	California, Land Withdrawal for Soldiers Mountain and Sugar Loaf Lookout Sites for the Administration of Shasta National Forest	Sept 15
645	5715	Hawaii, Restoration of Portion of Barracks Lot Military Reservation	Sept 16
646	5716	National Commission on Law Observance and Enforcement, Records Transferred to the Justice Department	Sept 16
647	5717	California, Federal Power Commission, Authorization to Issue a License for a Project on Public Water Reserve No. 116	Sept 17
648	5718	California, Revocation of Lands Withdrawn for Classification	Sept 17
649	5719	Michigan, Land Withdrawal for Lighthouse Purposes	Sept 17
650	5720	Gladys W. Eldridge, Exemption from Civil Service Rules on Appointment	Sept 18
651	5721	Upper Mississippi River Wildlife and Fish Refuge, Addition of Lands from Wisconsin, Illinois, Iowa, and Minnesota	Sept 19
652	5722	Government Island, California, United States Government Acceptance of the Land Title from the City of Alameda, California	Sept 22
653	5723	Uintah Railway Co., Authorization for a Railroad Right-of-way Across Certain Lands Withdrawn in Utah	Sept 22
654	5724	Civil Service Rules, Schedule A, Subdivision XVIII, Amendment	Sept 22
655	5725	Toiyabe National Forest, Nevada, Interpretation of Boundaries	Sept 24
656	5726	Arizona, Land Withdrawal for Willow Ranger Station for the Administration of Prescott National Forest	Sept 26
657	5727	Locomotive Springs Migratory Bird Refuge, Utah, Establishment	Sept 29
658	5728	Otoe and Missouria Indians, Oklahoma, Extension of Trust Period on Allotments	Sept 29
659	5729	California, Land Withdrawal for Resurvey	Oct. 02
660	5730	Walker River Indian Reservation, Nevada, Extension of Trust Period on Allotments	Oct. 08
661	5731	Civil Service Rules, Schedule A, Subdivision VII, Amendment	Oct. 13
662	5732	California, Land Withdrawal for Lookout Station	Oct. 14
663	5733	Wyoming, Coal Land Withdrawal, Wyoming No. 1, Modification to Permit a Withdrawal of Lands for an Air Navigation Site	Oct. 16
664	5734	Warm Springs Indian Reservation, Oregon, Extension of Trust Period on Allotments	Oct. 17
665	5735	New Mexico, Revocation of Lands Withdrawn for Resurvey and Such Lands Opened to Entry	Oct. 20
666	5736	Philippine Islands, Land Withdrawal for Military Purposes	Oct. 20
667	5737	Consular Regulations, Amendment	Oct. 22
668	5738	Louise A. Gallivan, Exemption from Civil Service Rules on Appointment	Oct. 29
669	5739	Idaho, Restoration of Lands Withdrawn for Power Site Reserve No. 117	Oct. 30
670	5740	St. Marks Migratory Bird Refuge, Florida, Establishment	Oct. 31
671	5741	Wyoming, Revocation of Lands Withdrawn for Resurvey and Such Lands Opened to Entry	Nov. 02
672	5742	William C. White, Exemption from Civil Service Rules on Appointment	Nov. 03
673	5743	Arkansas, Revocation of Lands Withdrawn for Classification and Such Lands Opened to Entry	Nov. 07
674	5744	Colorado, Restoration of Lands Withdrawn for Power Site Reserve No. 2	Nov. 07
675	5745	Wyoming, Restoration of Lands Withdrawn for Power Site Reserves No. 5 and 30	Nov. 07
676	5746	Yakima Indian Reservation, Washington, Extension of Trust Period on Allotments	Nov. 10
677	5747	Big Lake Bird Reservation, Arkansas, Exclusion of Lands from, and an Addition of Other Lands	Nov. 11
678	5748	Savannah River Bird Refuge, S.C., Abolished and the Savannah River Wildlife Refuge, Ga., S.C., Established	Nov. 12
679	5749	Colorado, Revocation of Lands Withdrawn for Resurvey and Such Lands Restored to the Rio Grande National Forest	Nov. 20
680	5750	California, Revocation of Lands Withdrawn for Lighthouse Purposes	Nov. 23
681	5751	Colorado, Land Withdrawal for Classification	Dec. 03
682	5752	New Mexico, Transfer of Lands from Datil National Forest to Cibola National Forest and the Name of Manzano National Forest Changed to Cibola National Forest	Dec. 03
683	5753	Civil Service Rule VII, Section 2, Amendment	Dec. 07
684	5754	Alaska, Land Withdrawal for Public Water Reserve No. 144	Dec. 07
685	5755	Mississippi, Land Withdrawal for Classification and Possible Inclusion in a National Forest	Dec. 10
686	5756	Montana, Transfer of Lands from Lewis and Clark National Forest to Helena National Forest	Dec. 16
687	5757	Montana, Transfer of Lands from Madison National Forest to Deerlodge National Forest and from Deerlodge National Forest to Beaverhead National Forest	Dec. 16
688	5758	Montana, Transfer of Lands from Lolo National Forest to Cabinet National Forest	Dec. 16
689	5759	Montana, Transfer of Lands from Madison, Missoula, and Helena National Forests to Deerlodge National Forest and Exclusion of Certain Lands from Deerlodge National Forest	Dec. 16
690	5760	Montana, Transfer of Lands from Madison National Forest to Gallatin National Forest	Dec. 16
691	5761	Montana, Transfer of Lands from Bitterroot and Missoula National Forests to Lolo National Forest	Dec. 16
692	5762	Florence F. Burton, Exemption from Civil Service Rules on Appointment	Dec. 18
693	5763	Christmas, 1931	Dec. 22
694	5764	Civil Service Rule V, Section 4, Amendment	Dec. 22
695	5765	New Mexico, Transfer of Lands from Datil National Forest to Gila National Forest	Dec. 24
696	5766	Yetta B. Floyd, Exemption from Civil Service Rules on Appointment	Dec. 30
697	5767	Hallie D. Stotler, Exemption from Civil Service Rules on Appointment	Dec. 30
698	5768	Indian Reservations, Extension of Trust Period on Allotments	Dec. 30
699	5769	Idaho, Restoration of Lands Withdrawn for Phosphate Reserve No. 9, Idaho No. 2	Dec. 30
700	5770	Port Everglades, Florida, Designation as a Customs Port of Entry	Dec. 30

=== 1932 ===
Relative No.	Absolute No.	Title/Description	Date signed
701	5771	Hawaii, Schofield Barracks Military Reservation, Restoration of Portion of Lands for a Road Right-of-way	Jan. 04
702	5772	Uintah Railway Co., Authorization for a Railroad Right-of-way Across Lands Withdrawn in Utah	Jan. 11
703	5773	Consular Regulations, Amendment	Jan. 11
704	5774	Civil Service Rules, Schedule A, Subdivision XVIII, Paragraph 12, Amendment	Jan. 13
705	5775	Miners in the Bureau of Mines, Transferred from the Noncompetitive to the Competitive Service	Jan. 15
706	5776	Civil Service Rule VI, Paragraph 1, Amendment	Jan. 18
707	5777	Civil Service Rules, Schedule B, Subdivision IV, Paragraph 3, Amendment	Jan. 19
708	5778	Payment of Prevailing Rate of Wages in Public Building Contracts, Stipulations	Jan. 19
709	5779	Tongass National Forest, Alaska, Exclusion of Lands From, and Such Lands Opened to Entry	Jan. 21
710	5780	Arizona and Utah, Restoration of Lands Withdrawn for Public Water Reserve No. 34, Arizona No. 5 and Public Water Reserve No. 1, Utah No. 1	Jan. 25
711	5781	Florence C. Brock, Exemption from Civil Service Rules on Appointment	Jan. 28
712	5782	Hutton Lake Migratory Bird Refuge, Wyo., Enlargement	Jan. 28
713	5783	Bamforth Lake Migratory Bird Refuge, Wyo., Enlargement	Jan. 29
714	5784	Alaska, Land Withdrawal for Use by the Alaska Road Commission	Jan. 29
715	5785	New Mexico, Revocation of Lands Withdrawn for Resurvcy	Jan. 29
716	5786	Defensive Sea Area Off the Coast of North Carolina, Establishment	Jan. 30
717	5787	Civil Service Rules, Schedule A, Subdivision Vi, Amendment	Feb. 02
718	5788	Panama Canal Zone, Regulations Governing the Size, Weight, and Speed of Motor Vehicles on Public Highways	Feb. 02
719	5789	California, Land Withdrawal for Resurvey	Feb. 02
720	5790	New Mexico, Land Withdrawal for Resurvey	Feb. 02
721	5791	Colorado, Land Withdrawal for Resurvey	Feb. 02
722	5792	Nevada, Land Withdrawal for Resurvey	Feb. 02
723	5793	Wyoming, Revocation of Lands Withdrawn for Resurvey and Such Lands Opened to Entry	Feb. 03
724	5794	California, Land Withdrawal for a Lookout Station	Feb. 05
725	5795	Wyoming, Restoration of Lands Withdrawn for Power Site Reserve No. 190	Feb. 09
726	5796	Illinois and Wisconsin, Land Withdrawal for Classification and Pending Legislation	Feb. 10
727	5797	Wyoming, Revocation of Lands Withdrawn for Resurvey and Such Lands Opened to Entry	Feb. 11
728	5798	Oregon, Restoration of Lands Withdrawn for Power Site Reserve No. 660	Feb. 11
729	5799	Mcclellan Peak Lookout Site, Nev., Land Withdrawal for the Administration of Tahoe National Forest	Feb. 15
730	5800	Montana, Transfer of Lands from Gallatin and Beartooth National Forests to Absaroka National Forest	Feb. 17
731	5801	Montana and South Dakota, Transfer of Lands from Absaroka and Beartooth National Forests to Custer National Forest	Feb. 17
732	5802	Sinclair A. Wilson, Exemption from Civil Service Rules on Appointment	Feb. 17
733	5803	Oregon, Land Withdrawal for a Fish Cultural Station	Feb. 19
734	5804	Ann Halloran, Exemption from Civil Service Rules on Appointment	Feb. 23
735	5805	New Mexico, Land Withdrawal for Resurvey	Feb. 23
736	5806	Alaska, Restoration of Lands Withdrawn for Town Site Purposes and Such Lands to Be Used for an Airport	Feb. 25
737	5807	Colorado, Land Withdrawal for Resurvey	Feb. 25
738	5808	Long Lake Migratory Bird Refuge, N. Dak., Enlargement	Feb. 25
739	5809	New Mexico, Revocation of Lands Withdrawn for Resurvey and Such Lands to Be Included in the Santa Fe National Forest	Feb. 27
740	5810	Utah, Revocation of Lands Withdrawn for Resurvey	Feb. 27
741	5811	Wanda Coolidge Carver, Exemption from Civil Service Rules on Appointment	Feb. 27
742	5812	Consular Regulations, Amendment	Feb. 29
743	5813	Alaska, Land Withdrawal for Investigation, Examination, and Classification of Coal Lands	Feb. 29
744	5814	Ocala National Forest and Ocala National Game Refuge, Fla., Enlargements	Mar. 01
745	5815	Alaska, Land Withdrawal for Investigation, Examination, and Classification of Coal Lands	Mar. 09
746	5816	Montana, Restoration of Lands Withdrawn for Power Site Reserve No. 155	Mar. 09
747	5817	Civil Service Rules, Schedule B, Subdivision III, Paragraph 2, Amendment	Mar. 10
748	5818	Washington, Land Withdrawal for Classification and Possible Inclusion in a Migratory Bird Refuge	Mar. 10
749	5819	Colorado, Revocation of Lands Withdrawn for Resurvey and Such Lands Opened to Entry	Mar. 12
750	5820	Arkansas, Revocation of Lands Withdrawn for Resurvey and Such Lands to Be Included in Ouachita National Forest	Mar. 16
751	5821	Joseph H. Hopkins, Suspension of Age Limit Requirement to Permit Appointment	Mar. 17
752	5822	Fred Scott, Exemption from Civil Service Rules on Appointment	Mar. 19
753	5823	Colorado, Revocation of Lands Withdrawn for Resurvey and Such Lands Opened to Entry	Mar. 21
754	5824	Income Tax Returns, Inspection	Mar. 22
755	5825	Foreign Service, Leaves of Absence	Mar. 26
756	5826	Colorado National Forest, Colo., Name Changed to Theodore Roosevelt National Forest	Mar. 28
757	5827	California, Land Withdrawal for Military Purposes	Mar. 28
758	5828	Nevada, Land Withdrawal for Naval Ammunition Depot	Mar. 30
759	5829	New Mexico, Land Withdrawal for Resurvey	Mar. 30
760	5830	War Minerals Relief Act, Authorization Given the Secretary of the Interior to Appoint Persons, Without Compliance With Civil Service Rules, to Administer the Act	Apr. 04
761	5831	Ruth Bascot Dam, Exemption from Civil Service Rules on Appointment	Apr. 04
762	5832	Fort St. Michael Military Reservation, Alaska, Reserved for Use by the Justice Department	Apr. 07
763	5833	Minnesota, Land Withdrawal for Classification and Possible Inclusion in a National Forest	Apr. 08
764	5834	Montana, Transfer of Lands from Jefferson National Forest to Lewis and Dark National Forest	Apr. 08
765	5835	Customs Ports of Entry, Extension of Limits: Ambrose, N. Dak.; St. John, N. Dak.; Noyes, Minn.; and Blaine, Wash.	Apr. 13
766	5836	California and Nevada, Land Withdrawal Pending Definite Location of Right-of-way for Transmission Lines from Boulder Canyon Project to Los Angeles	Apr. 13
767	5837	Tariff of United States Consular Fees, Amendment	Apr. 13
768	5838	Oregon, Land Withdrawal Pending Legislation	Apr. 18
769	5839	Ralph A. Vestal, Exemption from Civil Service Rules on Appointment	Apr. 19
770	5840	New Mexico, Revocation of Lands Withdrawn for Resurvey and Such Lands to Be Included in Santa Fe National Forest	Apr. 21
771	5841	Suislaw National Forest, Oreg., Exclusion of Lands From	Apr. 23
772	5842	Emilio Del Toro, Designation As Acting Judge of the District Court of the United States for Porto Rico	Apr. 28
773	5843	California, Land Withdrawal for Classification and Pending Legislation, Revocation of Lands Withdrawn for Indian Allotments	Apr. 28
774	5844	Michigan, Revocation of Lands Withdrawn for Resurvey and Such Lands to Be Included in Huron National Forest	Apr. 28
775	5845	Minnesota, Revocation of Lands Withdrawn for Resurvey and Such Lands to Be Included in Superior National Forest	Apr. 28
776	5846	Colorado, Land Withdrawal for Classification and Possible Inclusion in the Rocky Mountain National Park	May 2
777	5847	Warren Benjamin, Exemption from Civil Service Rules on Appointment	May 19
778	5848	Tariff of United States Consular Fees, Amendment	May 16
779	5849	Panama Canal Zone, Lands Opposite Balboa, Transfer of Jurisdiction to the Navy Department for a Naval Base	May 19
780	5850	Tucson, Ariz., Municipal Aviation Field, Transfer of Jurisdiction to the Government for Military Purposes	May 25
781	5851	Nesta Stephens Long, Exemption from Civil Service Rules on Appointment	May 28
782	5852	Gladys L. Knight, Exemption from Civil Service Rules on Appointment	June 1
783	5853	George H. Rolfe, Suspension of Age Limit Requirement to Permit Examination	June 3
784	5854	Northern Pacific Halibut Fishery, Establishment of a Patrol for Protection	June 3
785	5855	June 6; Radio Frequencies, Assignment to Government Radio Stations	June 6
786	5855-A	Radio Frequencies, Assignment to Government Radio Stations	June 6
787	5856	Tongass National Forest, Alaska, Exclusion of Lands From, and Such Lands Opened to Entry	June 11
788	5857	Consular Regulations, Amendment	June 16
789	5858	Semidi Islands Wildlife Refuge, Alaska, Establishment	June 17
790	5859	Civil Service Rules, Schedule A, Subdivision III, Paragraph 10, Revocation	June 21
791	5860	Passports, Regulations Governing the Granting and Issuing	June 22
792	5861	Eugene R. Capozio, Exemption from Civil Service Rules on Appointment	June 23
793	5862	Colorado, Land Withdrawal for Resurvey	June 23
794	5863	Nevada, Transfer of Lands from the Toiyabe National Forest to Nevada National Forest	June 23
795	5864	Oregon, Land Withdrawal for Lookout Station	June 23
796	5865	Flight Regulations for Various Branches of the Military	June 27
797	5866	Rates of Pay and Allowances of Enlisted Personnel of the Various Services	June 28
798	5867	Shenandoah National Forest, Virginia and West Virginia, Name Changed to George Washington National Forest, Virginia, and West Virginia	June 28
799	5868	California, Restoration of Lands Withdrawn for Reservoir Site Reserve No. 17	June 28
800	5869	Aliens, Documents Necessary to Enter the United States	June 30
801	5870	Government Travel Regulations, Standardization and Modification	June 30
802	5871	Sick Leave of Absence, Regulations Governing	June 30
803	5872	Retirement, Compulsory, Exemption of Certain Individuals	June 30
804	5873	Retirement, Compulsory, Exemption of Certain Individuals	June 30
805	5874	Retirement, Compulsory, Exemption of Certain Individuals	June 30
806	5875	Retirement, Compulsory, Exemption of Certain Individuals	June 30
807	5876	Montana, Restoration of Lands Withdrawn for Coal, Montana No. 7 and Montana No. 11	June 30
808	5877	Colorado, Revocation of Lands Withdrawn for Resurvey and Such Lands Opened to Entry	July 5
809	5878	Rates of Rental and Subsistence Allowances for Officers of the Various Services	July 6
810	5879	A. Blondell Howe, Exemption from Civil Service Rules on Appointment	July 7
811	5880	Panama Canal Zone, Delimiting of Judicial Districts	July 9
812	5881	Retirement, Compulsory, Exemption of Certain Individuals	July 9
813	5882	Crater National Forest, Oreg., Name Changed to Rogue River National Forest	July 9
814	5883	Colorado, Revocation of Lands Withdrawn for Resurvey and Such Lands Opened to Entry	July 11
815	5884	Wyoming, Revocation of Lands Withdrawn for Resurvey and Such Lands Opened to Entry	July 11
816	5885	California National Forest, Calif., Name Changed to Mendocino National Forest	July 12
817	5886	Wyoming, Land Withdrawal for Resurvey	July 12
818	5887	Administrative Furloughs, Regulations Governing	July 14
819	5888	Panama Canal Zone, Regulations Governing the Transportation of Liquors Over Highways and Waterways	July 16
820	5889	San Carlos Indian Irrigation Project, Ariz., Land Withdrawal for Project	July 16
821	5890	California, Revocation of Lands Withdrawn for Air Mail Beacon Sites and Landing Fields	July 16
822	5891	Oregon, Land Withdrawal for Classification and Possible Inclusion in a Migratory Bird Refuge	July 16
823	5892	Radio Division of the Commerce Department, Transferred to the Federal Radio Commission	July 20
824	5893	Lamar Costello, Exemption from Civil Service Rules on Appointment	July 26
825	5894	Colorado, Land Withdrawal for Resurvey	July 26
826	5895	Florida, Revocation of Lands Withdrawn for Resurvey	July 26
827	5896	Retirement, Compulsory, Exemption of Certain Individuals	July 29
828	5897	William Bertrand Acker, Exemption from Compulsory Retirement	July 30
829	5898	Arizona, Land Withdrawal Pending Legislation	Aug. 02
830	5899	Wyoming, Restoration of Lands Withdrawn for Public Water Reserve No. 2, Wyoming No. 1	Aug. 02
831	5900	Oregon, Land Withdrawal for Classification and Pending Legislation	Aug. 10
832	5901	Civil Service Rules, Schedule A, Subdivision Ix, Amendment	Aug. 18
833	5902	California, Land Withdrawal for Public Water Reserve No. 145	Aug. 18
834	5903	Nevada, Land Withdrawal for Classification and Possible Inclusion in a Migratory Bird Refuge	Aug. 18
835	5904	Wyoming, Land Withdrawal for Use by the Navy Department for Naval Petroleum Reserve No. 3	Aug. 18
836	5905	Sarah L. Curtiss, Exemption from Civil Service Rules on Appointment	Aug. 18
837	5906	California, Federal Power Commission, Authorization to Issue a License for a Project on Reservoir Site Reserve No. 17	Aug. 18
838	5907	Montana, New Mexico, Oregon, and Wyoming, Land Withdrawal for Public Water Reserve No. 146	Aug. 18
839	5908	California, Restoration of Lands Withdrawn for Municipal Water Supply Purposes and Right-of-way for a Water Conduit for Los Angeles	Aug. 22
840	5909	New Mexico, Land Withdrawal for Classification and Possible Inclusion in a Wildlife Refuge	Aug. 22
841	5910	Tariff of United States Consular Fees, Amendment	Aug. 23
842	5911	John W. Gindcr, Exemption from Compulsory Retirement	Aug. 24
843	5912	John P. Mcdowell, Exemption from Compulsory Retirement	Aug. 24
844	5913	Hot Springs National Park, Ark., Reservation of Lots	Aug. 25
845	5914	Long Lake Migratory Bird Refuge, N. Dakota, Enlargement	Aug. 26
846	5915	California, Restoration of Lands Withdrawn for Power Site Reserve No. 471	Aug. 31
847	5916	California, Restoration of Lands Withdrawn for Power Site Reserves No. 130, 238, and 387	Sept 02
848	5917	Albert D. Davis, Exemption from Compulsory Retirement	Sept 02
849	5918	Civil Service Commission, Authorization to Test the Qualifications of Applicants to the United States Military and Naval Academies	Sept 07
850	5919	Oregon, Restoration of Lands Withdrawn for Power Site Reserve No. 661	Sept 08
851	5920	New Mexico, Land Withdrawal for Resurvey	Sept 15
852	5921	Retirement, Compulsory, Exemption of Certain Individuals	Sept 15
853	5922	Civil Service Rules, Schedule B, Amendment	Sept 17
854	5923	Oregon, Land Withdrawal for Resurvey	Sept 20
855	5924	Federal Employees, Dropped or Furloughed for Reduction of Force, Priority in the Filling of Vacancies	Sept 20
856	5925	Idaho, Transfer of Lands from Boise and Challis National Forests to Sawtooth National Forest and from Sawtooth National Forest to Boise National Forest	Sept 21
857	5926	Idaho, Restoration of Lands Withdrawn for Power Site Reserves No. 102, 295, and 668	Sept 23
858	5927	California, Restoration of Lands Withdrawn for Power Site Reserve No. 706	Sept 28
859	5928	La Pine Administrative Site, Oreg., Lands Reserved for the Forest Service for the Administration of Deschutes National Forest	Sept 29
860	5929	Wisconsin, Land Withdrawal for Classification and Possible Inclusion in a National Forest	Oct. 01
861	5930	Civil Service Rules, Schedule A, Subdivision VII, Amendment	Oct. 06
862	5931	Round Top Military Reservation, Hawaii, Restoration of Lands Withdrawn for Right-of-way and Withdrawal of Other Lands for a Right-of-way	Oct. 08
863	5932	New Mexico, Revocation of Lands Withdrawn for Resurvey and Such Lands Opened to Entry	Oct. 10
864	5933	Wyoming, Revocation of Lands Withdrawn for Resurvey and Such Lands Opened to Entry	Oct. 10
865	5934	Colorado, Revocation of Lands Withdrawn for Resurvey and Such Lands Opened to Entry	Oct. 12
866	5935	Wyoming, Revocation of Lands Withdrawn for Resurvey and Such Lands Opened to Entry	Oct. 14
867	5936	California, Land Withdrawal for Classification and Possible Inclusion in a National Forest	Oct. 18
868	5937	Idaho, Restoration of Lands Withdrawn for Power Site Reserves No. 8 and 223	Oct. 18
869	5938	Harney National Forest, S. Dak., Enlargement	Oct. 24
870	5939	New Mexico, Revocation of Lands Withdrawn for Resurvey	Oct. 25
871	5940	William Bertrand Acker, Exemption from Compulsory Retirement	Oct. 26
872	5941	New Mexico, Restoration of Lands Withdrawn for Power Site Reserve No. 65	Oct. 26
873	5942	New Mexico, Land Withdrawal for Resurvey	Oct. 29
874	5943	Colorado, Revocation of Lands Withdrawn for Resurvey and Such Lands Opened to Entry	Oct. 29
875	5944	Nevada, Revocation of Lands Withdrawn for Resurvey and Such Lands Opened to Entry	Nov. 01
876	5945	Tule Lake Wildlife Refuge, Calif., Establishment	Nov. 03
877	5946	Retirement, Compulsory, Exemption of Certain Individuals	Nov. 16
878	5947	Tongass National Forest, Alaska, Exclusion of Lands From, and Such Lands Opened to Entry	Nov. 16
879	5948	Michigan, Modification of Lands Withdrawn Pending Legislation to Permit the State to Select Lands	Nov. 16
880	5949	Montana and Wyoming, Land Withdrawal for an Approach Road to Yellowstone National Park	Nov. 16
881	5950	Tongass National Forest, Alaska, Exclusion of Lands From, and Such Lands Opened to Entry	Nov. 19
882	5951	George R. Wales, Exemption from Compulsory Retirement	Nov. 22
883	5952	Army Rations, Kinds and Proportions	Nov. 23
884	5953	Indian Reservations, Extension of Trust Period on Allotments	Nov. 23
885	5954	Retirement, Compulsory, Exemption of Certain Individuals	Nov. 26
886	5955	Gertrude Lamb, Extension of Trust Period on Allotment	Nov. 30
887	5956	Instructions to Diplomatic Officers, Granting of Unsanctioned Political Asylum, Regulations	Dec. 01
888	5957	New Mexico, Restoration of Lands Withdrawn for Power Site Reserve No. 547	Dec. 07
889	5958	Arizona, Land Withdrawal for Resurvey	Dec. 08
890	5959	Administrative Accounting, Auditing, and Business Methods, Consolidation and Coordination of Governmental Activities	Dec. 09
891	5960	United States Commerce, Consolidation and Coordination of Governmental Activities	Dec. 09
892	5961	Labor Activities, Consolidation and Coordination of Governmental Activities	Dec. 09
893	5962	Interior Department, Consolidation and Grouping of Education, Health, and Recreation Activities	Dec. 09
894	5963	Land Utilization Agencies, Consolidation and Grouping in the Agriculture Department	Dec. 09
895	5964	Public Works Activities, Consolidation and Grouping in the Interior Department	Dec. 09
896	5965	Merchant Marine Activities, Consolidation and Grouping in the Commerce Department	Dec. 09
897	5966	Coast Guard Service, Unification of the Border Patrols, Combining of the Immigration Border Patrol and the Customs Border Patrol	Dec. 09
898	5967	Veterans' Administration, Transfer of Certain Functions to the Justice Department	Dec. 09
899	5968	Alien Property Custodian, Transfer of Duties, Powers, and Functions to the Justice Department	Dec. 09
900	5969	Employees' Compensation Commission, Transfer of Certain Functions to the Civil Service Commission	Dec. 09
901	5970	Income Tax Returns, Inspection	Dec. 13
902	5971	Utah, Revocation of Lands Withdrawn Pending Adjustment of Claims	Dec. 14
903	5972	Geraldine Rollins, Exemption from Civil Service Rules on Appointment	Dec. 15
904	5973	Consular Regulations, Amendment	Dec. 15
905	5974	Civil Service Rules, Schedule A, Subdivision III, Amendment	Dec. 16
906	5975	Oklahoma, Transfer of a Lot from the Custody of the Interior Department to the Treasury Department for a Federal Building Site	Dec. 16
907	5976	Washington, Land Withdrawal for Greenleaf Mountain Lookout Site	Dec. 16
908	5977	Executive Departments and Agencies, Closing in the District of Columbia, December 24 and 31, 1932	Dec. 19
909	5978	California, Revocation of Lands Withdrawn for Resurvey and Such Lands Opened to Entry	Dec. 19
910	5979	New Mexico, Revocation of Lands Withdrawn for Resurvey	Dec. 19
911	5980	Oregon and California Railroad Grant Lands, Modification, Authorization to the Interior Department to Withdraw Lands for Air Navigation Facilities	Dec. 22
912	5981	John T. Crowley, Exemption from Compulsory Retirement	Dec. 22
913	5982	Charles J. Harlow, Exemption from Compulsory Retirement	Dec. 22
914	5983	California, Revocation of Lands Withdrawn for Classification and Pending Legislation	Dec. 23
915	5984	Civil Service Rule VII, Section 1, Paragraph a, Amendment	Dec. 23

=== 1933 ===
Relative No.	Absolute No.	Title/Description	Date signed
916	5985	Montana, Restoration of Coal Land Withdrawal, Montana No. 1	Jan. 03
917	5986	James W. Higgins, Jr., Exemption from Civil Service Rules on Appointment	Jan. 03
918	5987	California, Revocation of Lands Withdrawn for Air Mail Beacon Sites and Landing Fields	Jan. 04
919	5988	Retirement, Compulsory, Exemption of Certain Individuals	Jan. 05
920	5989	Charles Orrin Townsend, Exemption from Compulsory Retirement	Jan. 05
921	5990	Colorado, Land Withdrawal for a Forest Administrative Site	Jan. 09
922	5991	Oregon, Transfer of Lands between Deschutes and Fremont National Forests	Jan. 12
923	5992	Charles Carran, Exemption from Civil Service Rules on Appointment	Jan. 12
924	5993	Baton Rouge, La., Designation as a Customs Port of Entry	Jan. 13
925	5994	Minnesota, Land Withdrawal Pending Legislation	Jan. 13
926	5995	Wyoming, Revocation of Lands Withdrawn for Resurvey and Such Lands Opened to Entry	Jan. 13
927	5996	Wyoming, Revocation of Lands Withdrawn for Resurvey and Such Lands Opened to Entry	Jan. 13
928	5997	Dirrelle Chancy, Exemption from Civil Service Rules on Appointment	Jan. 17
929	5998	Charles Gallagher, Exemption from Civil Service Rules on Appointment	Jan. 17
930	5999	Martha Owczarzak, Exemption from Civil Service Rules on Appointment	Jan. 17
931	6000	Josephine Horigan, Exemption from Civil Service Rules on Appointment	Jan. 18
932	6001	Land offices in Little Rock, Ark., Alliance, Nebr., Cass Lake, Minn., and Gainesville, Fla., Transfer of Business to the General Land Office in Washington, D.C.	Jan. 18
933	6002	Arizona, Land Withdrawal for an Administrative Site for the Maintenance and Operation of Gaging Stations	Jan. 18
934	6003	Paula Gillespie, Inclusion in the Classified Service	Jan. 18
935	6004	Oliver M. Maxam, Exemption from Compulsory Retirement	Jan. 19
936	6005	Kathleen M. Glancy, Exemption from Civil Service Rules on Appointment	Jan. 21
937	6005-A	Revoking Executive Order No. 3360 of November 28, 1920, Prescribing Specifications for an Official Flag for the Office of the Secretary of State	Jan. 21
938	6006	Alaska, Land Withdrawal for Public Water Reserve No. 147	Jan. 23
939	6007	Carl R. Shepard, Exemption from Civil Service Rules on Appointment	Jan. 26
940	6008	Colorado, Revocation of Lands Withdrawn for Resurvey and Such Lands Opened to Entry	Jan. 30
941	6009	California, Transfer of Jurisdiction of Lands to the Navy Department for Naval Purposes	Jan. 31
942	6010	Panama Canal Zone, Boundary Revisions for Fort Randolph and France Field	Jan. 31
943	6011	Tongass National Forest, Alaska, Exclusion of Lands from, and Such Lands Opened to Entry	Feb. 01
944	6012	Utah, Land Withdrawal for an Agricultural Range Experiment Station	Feb. 01
945	6013	Retirement, Compulsory, Exemption of Certain Individuals	Feb. 03
946	6014	Oregon, Land Withdrawal for Resurvey	Feb. 06
947	6015	Montana, Restoration of Coal Land Withdrawal, Montana No. 1	Feb. 06
948	6016	Secretary of the Interior, Authorization to Issue Oil and Gas Permits and Leases on Withdrawn Oil Shale Lands	Feb. 06
949	6017	Consular Regulations, Amendment	Feb. 07
950	6018	Alien Property Custodian, Delegation of Further Powers under the Trading with the Enemy Act	Feb. 07
951	6019	Oregon and Utah, Land Withdrawal for Public Water Reserve No. 148	Feb. 07
952	6020	Richard H. Knight, Exemption from Civil Service Rules on Reinstatement	Feb. 09
953	6021	Sick Leave Regulations	Feb. 09
954	6022	Ernest F. Moessncr, Exemption from Compulsory Retirement	Feb. 10
955	6022-A	Harry A. McBride, Inclusion in the Classified Service	Feb. 10
956	6023	District of Columbia, Airspace Reservation	Feb. 11
957	6024	Edward N. Dingley, Jr., Exemption from Civil Service Rules on Reinstatement	Feb. 11
958	6025	Montana and Wyoming, Land Withdrawal for Public Water Reserve No. 149	Feb. 14
959	6026	Sterling L. Morelock, Exemption from Civil Service Rules on Appointment	Feb. 14
960	6027	John Storey, Exemption from Compulsory Retirement	Feb. 14
961	6028	Appointment of Certain Individuals in the Labor Department without Compliance with Civil Service Rules	Feb. 16
962	6029	Mary Stewart, Exemption from Civil Service Rules on Appointment	Feb. 16
963	6030	Charles J. James, Exemption from Compulsory Retirement	Feb. 17
964	6031	Alice W. Goodwin, Exemption from Civil Service Rules on Appointment	Feb. 18
965	6032	Isaac Gregg, Exemption from Civil Service Rules on Appointment	Feb. 18
966	6033	Ann F. Kammerer, Exemption from Civil Service Rules on Appointment	Feb. 18
967	6034	Joseph A. Kinnahan, Exemption from Civil Service Rules on Appointment	Feb. 18
968	6035	Kenneth C. Macpherson, Exemption from Civil Service Rules on Appointment	Feb. 18
969	6036	Edmond M. Martin, Exemption from Civil Service Rules on Appointment	Feb. 18
970	6037	Alice Mummenhoff, Exemption from Civil Service Rules on Appointment	Feb. 18
971	6038	Laurence Gouverneur Hoes, Exemption from Civil Service Rules on Appointment	Feb. 20
972	6039	Alaska, Revocation of Land Withdrawal and Other Lands to be Withdrawn for the Alaska Game Commission and War Department	Feb. 20
973	6040	Oregon, Land Withdrawal for Public Water Reserve No. 150	Feb. 20
974	6041	Adelle B. Freeman, Exemption from Civil Service Rules on Appointment	Feb. 21
975	6042	Grace F. Smythe, Exemption from Civil Service Rules on Appointment	Feb. 21
976	6043	Civil Service Rule IX, Section lb, Amendment	Feb. 23
977	6044	Alaska, Land Withdrawal to Protect Native Fishing Rights	Feb. 23
978	6045	Sitka Dock Site, Alaska, Modification of Land Description	Feb. 24
979	6046	Civil Service Rules, Schedule A, Subdivision IV, Paragraph 10, Amendment	Feb. 24
980	6047	Civil Service Rules, Schedule A, Subdivision III, Paragraph 1, Revocation	Feb. 25
981	6048	Harry E. Timmis, Exemption from Civil Service Rules on Appointment	Feb. 25
982	6049	Milton Harold Powell, Exemption from Civil Service Rules on Appointment	Feb. 27
983	6050	Tongass National Forest, Alaska, Exclusion of Lands for an Army Radio Station	Feb. 27
984	6051	Virgin Islands, Federal Employees, Permission to Hold Positions in the Local Colonial Councils	Feb. 27
985	6052	Marie K. Kaley, Exemption from Civil Service Rules on Appointment	Feb. 27
986	6053	California, Modification of Reservoir Site Reserve No. 17	Feb. 28
987	6054	Colorado, Land Withdrawal for Resurvey	Feb. 28
988	6055	Colorado, Land Withdrawal for Resurvey	Feb. 28
989	6056	G. Harold Keatley, Exemption from Civil Service Rules on Appointment	Feb. 28
990	6057	Clara L. Hess, Exemption from Civil Service Rules on Appointment	Mar. 01
991	6058	Mrs. Jessie N. Barber, Exemption from Civil Service Rules on Appointment	Mar. 01
992	6059	Irvin S. Goldbarth, Exemption from Civil Service Rules on Appointment	Mar. 02
993	6060	President's Emergency Committee and the President's Organization for Unemployment Relief, Transfer of Records to the Commerce Department	Mar. 02
994	6061	Joseph Gambaro and Solomon Israel, Exemption from Civil Service Rules on Appointments	Mar. 02
995	6062	Ruby Mac Webb, Exemption from Civil Service Rules on Appointment	Mar. 02
996	6063	Ellen T. Purcell and J. Elizabeth Williams, Exemption from Civil Service Rules on Appointments	Mar. 02
997	6064	Revocation of Order Restricting the Transportation of Passengers from Certain Oriental Ports to the U.S.	Mar. 03
998	6065	Boulder Canyon Wildlife Refuge, Arizona and Nevada, Establishment	Mar. 03
999	6066	Edwin Sheddan Cunningham, Retention in the Foreign Service	Mar. 03
1000	6067	Thomas H. Allen, Exemption from Civil Service Rules on Appointment	Mar. 03
1001	6068	Daphne Mary Byrne, Appointment in the Classified Service	Mar. 03
1002	6069	John M. Hooe, Exemption from Civil Service Rules on Appointment	Mar. 03
1003	6070	Mary A. McClung, Exemption from Civil Service Rules on Appointment	Mar. 03

== Presidential proclamations ==
=== 1929 ===
- Proclamation of Holy Cross as a National Monument, proclamation 1877, 11 May 1929

== Sources ==
Herbert Hoover: Proclamations and Executive Orders, March 4, 1929, to March 4, 1933. [Books 1 and 2]

=== Lists ===
- Original Table of Contents
- Proclamations 1929 to 1933, Book 2, pages 1463 to 1467
- Executive Orders 1929 to 1933, Book 2, pages 1468 to 1506
- Procs & EOs affected by issuances on both above lists, Book 2, pages 1507 to 1519
- Index, Book 2, pages 1521 to 1566

=== Text ===
- Proclamations Nos. 1870 → 2037 1929 to 1933, Book 1, pages 3 to 282
- Executive Orders 1929 to 1933,
  - Book 1, EO Nos. 5076 → 5549 pages 285 to 780
  - Book 2, EO Nos. 5550 → 6070 pages 781 to 1460
