= Navicert =

WWI and WWII British-issued commercial passport

The navicert, short for navigation certificate, also known as a "Letter of Assurance", was a form of commercial passport issued to allow ships to pass through blockades without inspection. This was of particular relevance during the British naval blockades of Germany in World War I and World War II.

== Background ==
Navicerts were introduced at the suggestion of US Consul General in London Robert Peet Skinner and first issued in March 1916, as a method of reducing the inconvenience of the blockade to neutral trade. The system was reintroduced for World War II starting 1 December 1939.

A notice on 17 November 1939 explained the system:

For the benefit of exporters and others who are not familiar with the operation of the system, a navicert may be explained as a form of commercial passport. Intending exporters desiring to take advantage of the system may apply to the nearest British Consulate on special forms obtainable from any British Consulate in the U. S. and, if the intended consignment is regarded as unobjectionable, they will be granted a navicert for it. A charge of two dollars will be made for navicerts granted, to cover the cost of the necessary telegraphic enquiries. The navicert must be carried in the same ship as the goods to which it relates, and it will then ensure favourable treatment at the hands of the British contraband patrols. Vessels whose entire cargo is covered by navicerts will be subjected to the minimum of delay.

— British Embassy

Navicerts were approached legally as the British authorities voluntarily refraining from their rights of visit and search. This meant that these ships whose entire cargoes were navicerted could avoid delays and uncertainty from being stopped and searched, or diverted to a British port for inspection. The system also provided numerous benefits to the British. It reduced the burden on the British navy and prize courts to police the blockade, conduct inspections and make judgements. Further, the system encouraged neutrals to cooperate with the blockade, as exporters of acceptable goods would insist that their cargo be not co-mingled with unacceptable goods that would cause the whole shipment to be delayed. Quotas could also be imposed on navicerts to stop neutrals from accruing surpluses that could be exported to enemies. However, by cooperating with the British in this way, it has been argued that neutrals were breaching their neutrality by conducting activity (including allowing inspection by British officials) in favour of a belligerent on their territory. The US did not officially endorse the system while neutral in World War II.

The system was highly successful in World War I, with 30,000 granted out of 40,000 applications by the United States' entry into World War I in April 1917. The system continued to be used with American trade until all exports came under the control of the War Trade Board. In World War II the system was quickly begun in December 1939 under the Ministry of Economic Warfare, and became compulsory by July 1940, with 5000–7000 applications made per month in 1941. A similar system called mailcert was implemented for mail. A so-called "reverse-navicert" was also used, the "certificate of origin and interest" system, which certified that ships did not transport German products. The system ended at the end of September 1946.

A blank example of a World War II navicert can be found in Matson's book on the topic.

Though in a modern war the implementation of the navicert system would likely be quite different, as of 2014 US and German military manuals include the navicert system as a legitimate mechanism for conducting a blockade (mostly replacing prize courts) and do not consider it a violation of neutrality.

== See also ==
- Cartaz
