= Robert Peet Skinner =

American diplomat

Robert P. Skinner
- Skinner in 1923

United States Ambassador to Turkey
- In office 1933–1936
- Preceded by: Charles H. Sherrill
- Succeeded by: John Van Antwerp MacMurray

United States Ambassador to Lithuania
- In office 1931–1933
- Preceded by: Frederick W. B. Coleman
- Succeeded by: John Van Antwerp MacMurray

United States Ambassador to Latvia
- In office 1931–1933
- Preceded by: Frederick W. B. Coleman
- Succeeded by: John Van Antwerp MacMurray

United States Ambassador to Estonia
- In office 1931–1933
- Preceded by: Frederick W. B. Coleman
- Succeeded by: John Van Antwerp MacMurray

United States Ambassador to Greece
- In office 1926–1932
- Preceded by: Irwin B. Laughlin
- Succeeded by: Lincoln MacVeagh

Personal details
- Born: Robert Peet Skinner; February 24, 1866 Massillon, Ohio, U.S.
- Died: July 1, 1960 (aged 94) Belfast, Maine, U.S.
- Resting place: Massillon, Ohio, U.S.
- Spouse: Helen Wales (m. 1897)

Robert Peet Skinner (February 24, 1866 – July 1, 1960) was an American diplomat, editor, and publisher.

== Early life ==
Skinner was born on February 24, 1866, in Massillon, Ohio, to Augustus T. Skinner and Cecelia van Rensselaer. His father was a native of Massillon, his grandfather Charles K. Skinner was an early settler of Kendal and his great-grandfather was a veteran of the Revolutionary War. He attended common schools, including a school in Cincinnati.

== Career ==
At the age of 19, he became the editor and owner of a local paper called The Evening Independent. Through his work with the paper he would become acquainted with William McKinley, whom Skinner would support for the presidency. He worked for the New York World as a telegraph editor. He worked as a political correspondent. On June 17, 1897, he married Helen Wales, daughter of Arvine C. Wales.

Through his wife's family and his own connections, Skinner would be awarded for his support for President McKinley with a wedding gift, a role in the McKinley administration. McKinley made him the United States Consul in Marseille from 1897 to 1901; starting up his career in foreign service. He would later become the United States Consul General in Marseille from 1901 to 1908; United States Consul General at the Consulate General of the United States, Hamburg from 1908 to 1914; United States Consul General at the Embassy of the United States, Berlin in 1914; United States Consul General at the Embassy of the United States, London from 1914 to 1924.

During his time in France, Skinner would become familiar with French colonial governance. He would become particularly interested with the prospect of establishing a trade deal for the United States with Abyssinia. In 1903 President Roosevelt would take interest in Skinner's proposal and order the diplomat to go to Africa. He arrived along with other representatives and a contingent of thirty U.S. marines in October of that year; they sailed into Djibouti from Naples before traveling to their destination via camel over a twenty-two day trek. Upon arriving they were escorted by 5,000 native troops to their audience with Emperor Menelik II. Ultimately the mission would be seen as a success, there would be increased trade between the two countries, due to a negotiated ten year commercial treaty. His mission would also see a growth of American fascination with their new African partner and provided a foothold into the continent for the still growing country. Upon returning to the United States, Skinner would publish an account of this mission in 1906.

While in post in London, in March 1916, Skinner proposed a method of allowing United States' and other neutral merchant shipping to pass through the Allied blockade without the irksome inspection procedure required to check for contraband goods that might help the German war effort. He proposed that a certified manifest could be sent in advance by telegram to the local British embassy, which, if agreed, could issue a document known as a "navicert", which would allow the cargo to pass through the blockade without the need for inspection. The navicert system was highly successful and continued for US shipping until the American entry into the war and for other neutral nations until the blockade was lifted in 1919.

He was the United States Ambassador to Greece from 1926 to 1932; United States Ambassador to Estonia from 1931 to 1933; United States Ambassador to Latvia from 1931 to 1933; United States Ambassador to Lithuania, 1931 to 1933; United States Ambassador to Turkey from 1933 to 1936.

== Personal life ==
During his time in Paris, Skinner resided from 15 November 1935 for nearly three years at the Hôtel de Besenval, before the hôtel particulier was sold to the Swiss Confederation. He died in Belfast, Maine on July 1, 1960. He was buried in Massillon City Cemetery in Massillon, Ohio.
