= Frederick W. B. Coleman =

American diplomat

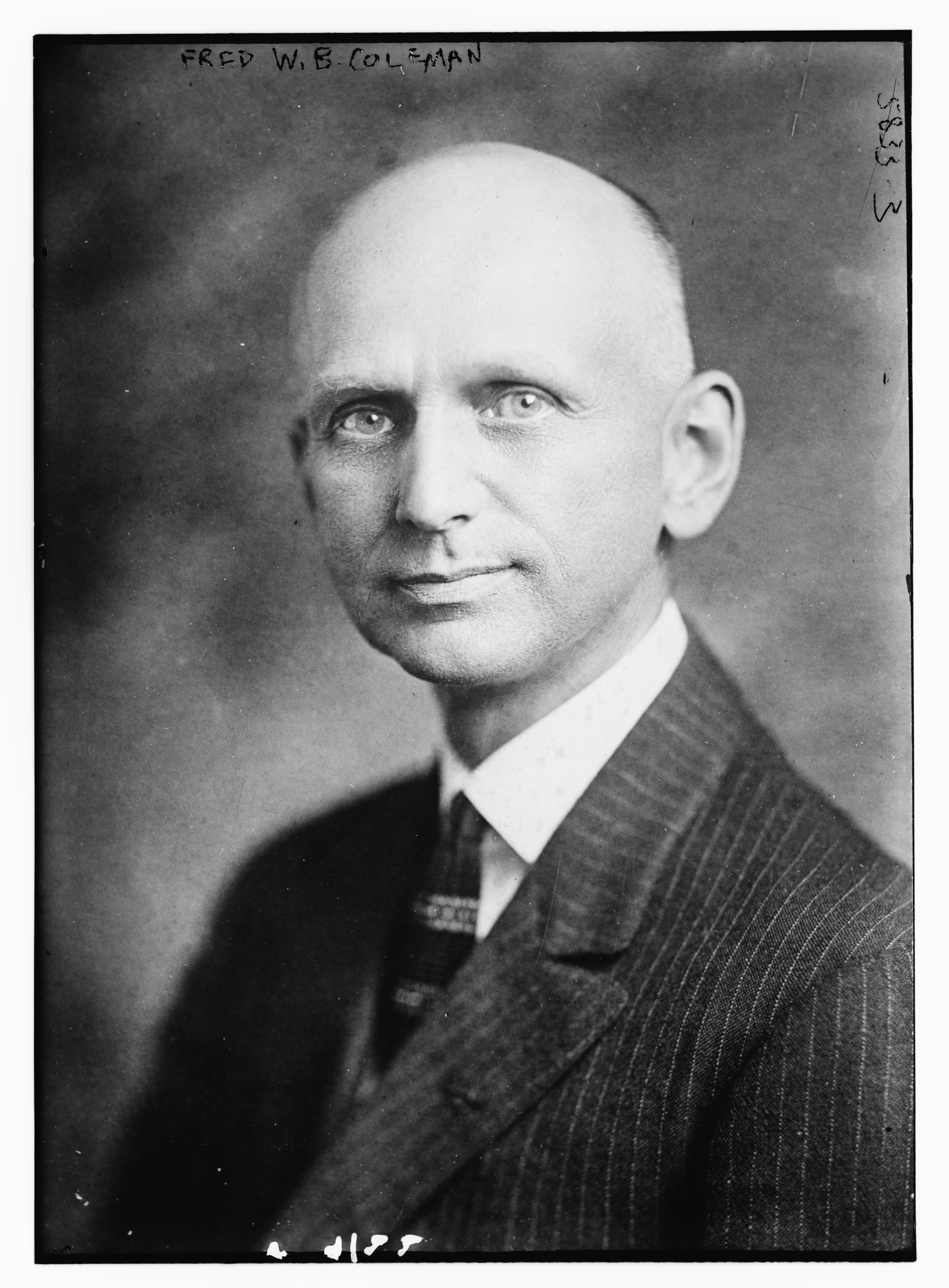
Coleman in the 1920s.

Frederick William Backus Coleman (May 17, 1874 in Detroit, Michigan–1947) was the first U.S. Envoy Extraordinary and Minister Plenipotentiary to the Baltic States of Estonia, Latvia, and Lithuania from 1922 until 1931.

Coleman studied abroad in Heidelberg, Germany before graduating from the University of Michigan in 1896, and receiving a law degree from there three years later. He honed his German and French language skills while working for the Featherbone Manufacturing company in London and Hamburg. Coleman represented American coal interests on Svalbard as attorney and traveled in the Nordics during the first years of World War I. After the United States entered the war in 1917, Coleman joined Fort Snelling, became second lieutenant in the quartermaster corps and served in Paris and Neufchâteau. President Warren Harding submitted his nomination to become U.S. representative in the Baltics. After that he was a non-career appointee serving as the American Envoy Extraordinary and Minister Plenipotentiary to Denmark from 1931 to 1933. His post in the Baltics was taken over by Robert Peet Skinner, who formerly served in Greece.

A detailed account of Frederick Coleman's life and work can be found in the diaries he kept from 1909 to 1938. Currently a part of the archival collection at Hoover Institution at Stanford University, the diaries contain not only his meetings and events attended, but also his views on culture, an honest account of his health, and many photographs of his family, peers, pets, places he visited, as well as local life in the Baltics. When Coleman was 66, he graduated with a degree in library science from the University of North Carolina.
