= SFCW =

SFCW may refer to:

- Salem, Falls City and Western Railway a defunct American railroad company
- Solid Fuels Coordinator for War, a predecessor of Solid Fuels Administration for War, a defunct U.S. government agency
- South Florida Championship Wrestling, an American professional wrestling organization
- Subsurface flow constructed wetland, a type of constructed wetland
- Stepped-Frequency Continuous-wave radar (SFCW radar)
