= List of executive actions by Harry S. Truman =

The president of the United States may take any of several kinds of executive actions.

Executive orders are issued to help officers and agencies of the executive branch manage the operations within the federal government itself. Presidential memoranda are closely related, and have the force of law on the Executive Branch, but are generally considered less prestigious. Presidential memoranda do not have an established process for issuance, and unlike executive orders, they are not numbered. A presidential determination results in an official policy or position of the executive branch of the United States government. A presidential proclamation is a statement issued by a president on a matter of public policy, under specific authority granted to the president by Congress, typically on a matter of widespread interest. Administrative orders are signed documents such as notices, letters, and orders, that can be issued to conduct administrative operations of the federal government. A presidential notice or a presidential sequestration order can also be issued.

Listed below are executive orders numbered 9538–10431 signed by United States President Harry S. Truman (1945–1953). He issued 896 executive orders. His executive orders are also listed on Wikisource, along with his presidential proclamations.

Signature of Harry S. Truman

== Executive orders ==
=== 1945 ===
Relative No.	Absolute No.	Title / Description	Date signed
1	9538	Authorizing Certification for Probational Appointment of Persons Who Lost Opportunity for Probational Appointment Because of Entry Into the Armed Forces	April 13, 1945
2	9539	Reinstating Avra M. Warren in the Foreign Service of the United States	April 13, 1945
3	9540	Authorizing the Petroleum Administrator To Take Possession of and To Operate the Plants and Facilities of the Cities Service Refining Corporation, Located in and Around Lake Charles, Louisiana	April 17, 1945
4	9541	Transferring the Office of Surplus Property of the Procurement Division of the Department of the Treasury to the Department of Commerce	April 19, 1945
5	9542	Authorizing the Secretary of the Navy To Take Possession of and To Operate the Plants and Facilities of the United Engineering Company, Ltd., Located at San Francisco, California	April 23, 1945
6	9543	Designating the Reconstruction Finance Corporation as the Agency To Act With Respect to Certain Bonds, Notes, and Other Securities Acquired on Behalf of the United States Under the Provisions of the Transportation Act, 1920	April 23, 1945
7	9544	Authorizing and Directing the Secretary of War To Assume Full Control of a Certain Airport	April 25, 1945
8	9545	Restoring Certain Lands Comprising Part of the Aiea Military Reservation to the Use of the Territory of Hawaii	April 27, 1945
9	9546	Inspection by the Federal Security Agency of Statistical Transcript Punch Cards Prepared From Individual Income Tax Returns	May 1, 1945
10	9547	Providing for Representation of the United States in Preparing and Prosecuting Charges of Atrocities and War Crimes Against the Leaders of the European Axis Powers and Their Principal Agents and Accessories	May 2, 1945
11	9548	Authorizing the Secretary of the Interior To Take Possession of and To Operate Certain Coal Mines	May 3, 1945
12	9549	Designation of Mrs. Ruth W. Talley and Mrs. Alice B. Grove To Sign Land Patents	May 8, 1945
13	9550	Regulations Relating to Aerial Flights by Personnel of the Coast and Geodetic Survey	May 10, 1945
14	9551	Providing for the Transfer to the Republic of Panama of the Water and Sewerage Systems Installed by the United States in the Cities of Panama and Colon	May 16, 1945
15	9552	Authorizing the Secretary of War To Take Possession of and Operate the Plants and Facilities of the Cocker Machine and Foundry Company, Located at Gastonia, North Carolina	May 19, 1945
16	9553	Creating an Emergency Board To Investigate a Dispute Between the River Terminal Railway Company and Its Employees	May 22, 1945
17	9554	Possession and Operation of Property of Motor Carriers in and About the City of Chicago, Illinois	May 23, 1945
18	9555	Creating an Emergency Board To Investigate a Dispute Between the Illinois Central Railroad and Its Employees	May 24, 1945
19	9556	Providing for the Exercise of Certain Functions, Duties, and Powers of the President With Respect to Certain Court Martial Cases by the Secretary of War, the Under Secretary of War, the Secretary of the Navy and the Under Secretary of the Navy	May 26, 1945
20	9557	Amendment of Executive Order 9210 of August 1, 1942, Prescribing Regulations Governing the Payment of Additional Compensation to Enlisted Men of the Navy and Coast Guard Specially Qualified in the Use of Arms	May 26, 1945
21	9558	Reinstating Certain Foreign Service Officers	May 26, 1945
22	9559	Authorizing the Secretary of War To Take Possession of and Operate the Plants and Facilities of the Gaffney Manufacturing Company, Located at Gaffney, South Carolina	May 28, 1945
23	9560	Authorizing the Secretary of War To Take Possession of and Operate the Plants and Facilities of the Mary-Leila Cotton Mills, Inc., Located at Greensboro, Georgia	June 1, 1945
24	9561	Amending Executive Order No. 9386 of October 15, 1943, Prescribing Regulations Governing the Granting of Allowances for Quarters and Subsistence To Enlisted Men	June 1, 1945
25	9562	Termination of the Office of Civilian Defense	June 4, 1945
26	9563	Amendment of Rule 46 of Executive Order No. 4314 of September 25, 1925, Establishing Rules Governing Navigation of the Panama Canal and Adjacent Waters	June 4, 1945
27	9564	Authorizing the Petroleum Administrator To Take Possession of and Operate the Plants and Facilities of the Humble Oil and Refining Company Located in Ingleside, Texas	June 5, 1945
28	9565	Authorizing the Petroleum Administrator To Take Possession of and Operate the Plants and Facilities at Cabin Creek Oil Field of the Pure Oil Company, Located at Dawes, West Virginia	June 5, 1945
29	9566	Revocation of Executive Order 9090 of March 6, 1942, Establishing an Airspace Reservation Over Portions of Ulster and Dutchess Counties, New York	June 5, 1945
30	9567	Amending Executive Order No. 9095, as Amended by Executive Order No. 9193, To Define Further the Functions and Duties of the Alien Property Custodian With Respect to Property of Germany and Japan and Nationals Thereof	June 8, 1945
31	9568	Providing for the Release of Scientific Information	June 8, 1945
32	9569	Inspection by the Office of Price Administration of Corporation Statistical Transcript Cards Prepared From Income and Declared Value Excess Profits Tax Returns	June 14, 1945
33	9570	Possession and Operation of the Transportation System, Plants, and Facilities of the Scranton Transit Company Located in and About the City of Scranton, Pennsylvania	June 14, 1945
34	9571	Authorizing the Secretary of the Interior To Acquire and Dispose of Certain Property	June 15, 1945
35	9572	Possession, Control, and Operation of Toledo, Peoria & Western Railroad	June 15, 1945
36	9573	Creating an Emergency Board To Investigate a Dispute Between the Georgia and Florida Railroad and Its Employees	June 16, 1945
37	9574	Authorizing the Secretary of War To Take Possession of and Operate the Plants and Facilities of the Diamond Alkali Company, Located in or Around Painesville, Ohio	June 18, 1945
38	9575	Declaring the Commissioned Corps of the Public Health Service To Be a Military Service and Prescribing Regulations Therefore,	June 21, 1945
39	9576	Creating an Emergency Board To Investigate a Dispute Between the Erie Railroad Company and Its Employees	June 28, 1945
40	9577	Terminating the War Food Administration and Transferring Its Functions to the Secretary of Agriculture	June 29, 1945
41	9577-A	Authorizing the Petroleum Administrator To Take Possession of and Operate the Plants and Facilities of the Texas Company Located in or Around Port Arthur, Texas	July 1, 1945
42	9578	Approving Regulations of the Civil Service Commission Under the Federal Employees Pay Act of 1945	June 30, 1945
43	9579	Amendment of Executive Order No. 8937 of November 7, 1941 Extending the Period of Eligibility on Civil Service Registers or Lists of Persons Who Serve in the Armed Forces of the United States	June 30, 1945
44	9580	Amendment of Executive Order No. 1888 of February 2, 1914, Relating to Conditions of Employment in the Service of the Panama Canal and the Panama Railroad Company on the Isthmus of Panama, as Amended	June 30, 1945
45	9581	Amending Executive Order No. 9299 of February 4, 1943, To Give the Territorial War Labor Board for the Territory of Hawaii Jurisdiction Over Voluntary Wage and Salary Adjustments of Employees in the Territory of Hawaii Subject to the Railway Labor Act	June 30, 1945
46	9582	Restoring Land to the Territory of Hawaii for Aeronautical Purposes, and Reserving Land for Military Purposes	June 30, 1945
47	9583	Amendment of Executive Order 9356 of June 24, 1943, Prescribing Regulations Governing the Furnishing of Clothing in Kind or Payment of Cash Allowances in Lieu Thereof to Enlisted Personnel of the Navy, the Coast Guard, the Naval Reserve, and the Coast Guard Reserve	July 2, 1945
48	9584	Suspending Certain Statutory Provisions Relating to Employment in the Canal Zone	July 3, 1945
49	9585	Authorizing the Secretary of the Navy To Take Possession of and Operate the Plants and Facilities of Goodyear Tire & Rubber Company Inc., Located at Akron, Ohio	July 4, 1945
50	9586	The Medal of Freedom	July 6, 1945
51	9587	Amending Executive Order 8588 Entitled Prescribing Regulations Governing the Payment of Expenses of Transportation of Household Goods and Personal Effects of Certain Civilian Officers and Employees of the United States and Prescribing Regulations Governing the Payment of Expenses of Transportation of the Immediate Family of Civilian Officers and Employees of the Government	July 6, 1945
52	9588	Creating an Emergency Board To Investigate the Disputes Between the Chicago, North Shore & Milwaukee Railroad Company and the Chicago, Aurora & Elgin Railroad Company and Their Employees	July 6, 1945
53	9589	Restricting Competition in Certain Civil Service Examinations to Veterans	July 16, 1945
54	9589-A	Authorizing the Petroleum Administrator To Take Possession of and Operate the Butadiene Plant Operated by Sinclair Rubber, Inc., at Houston, Texas	July 19, 1945
55	9590	Establishing Certain Awards for the Coast and Geodetic Survey	July 21, 1945
56	9591	Amending the Foreign Service Regulations of the United States	July 21, 1945
57	9592	Extension of the Provisions of Executive Order No. 9001 of December 27, 1941, to Contracts of the Office of War Information and the Office of Alien Property Custodian	July 21, 1945
58	9592-A	Amendment of Executive Order No. 9400 of December 3, 1943, Authorizing the Secretary of the Navy To Take Possession of and Operate the Shipyard of the Los Angeles Shipbuilding and Drydock Corporation at Los Angeles, California	July 23, 1945
59	9593	Authorizing the Secretary of War To Take Possession of and Operate the Plants and Facilities of the Springfield Plywood Corporation, Located at Springfield, Oregon	July 25, 1945
60	9594	Designating the Chief of Engineers, United States Army, as a Member of the Federal Fire Council in Lieu of the Quartermaster General	July 28, 1945
61	9595	Authorizing the Secretary of War To Take Possession of and Operate the Plants and Facilities of the United States Rubber Company, Located in or Around Detroit, Michigan	July 30, 1945
62	9596	Revoking Executive Order No. 9528 Which Provides a Change in the Order of Succession of Officers To Act as Secretary of the Navy	August 13, 1945
63	9597	Amending Executive Order No. 9240 Entitled Regulations Relating to Overtime Wage Compensation	August 14, 1945
64	9598	Modifying the Conditions Upon Which a Classified Status May Be Granted	August 17, 1945
65	9599	Providing for Assistance To Expand Production and Continued Stabilization of the National Economy During the Transition From War to Peace, and for the Orderly Modification of Wartime Controls Over Prices, Wages, Materials, and Facilities	August 18, 1945
66	9600	Amending Executive Order No. 9240 Entitled Regulations Relating to Overtime Wage Compensation	August 18, 1945
67	9601	Revocation of Executive Order 9240, as Amended, Entitled Regulations Relating to Overtime Compensation	August 21, 1945
68	9602	Possession, Control, and Operation of the Transportation System, Plants, and Facilities of the Illinois Central Railroad Company	August 23, 1945
69	9603	Termination of Possession of Certain Property Taken by the Government	August 25, 1945
70	9604	Providing for the Release of Scientific Information (Extension and Amendment of Executive Order No. 9568)	August 25, 1945
71	9605	Revoking Paragraph 4 of Executive Order No. 9279 of December 5, 1943, So As To Permit Voluntary Enlistments in the Armed Forces	August 29, 1945
72	9606	Adopting and Ratifying the Capture of the German Motor Vessel Caribia	August 29, 1945
73	9607	Revoking Executive Order 9301 of February 9, 1943, Establishing a Minimum Wartime Workweek of Forty-Eight Hours	August 30, 1945
74	9608	Providing for the Termination of the Office of War Information, and for the Disposition of Its Functions and of Certain Functions of the Office of Inter-American Affairs	August 31, 1945
75	9609	Authorizing the National Advisory Committee for Aeronautics To Acquire and Dispose of Property	September 5, 1945
76	9610	Authorizing the Administrator of Veterans' Affairs To Acquire and Dispose of Property	September 6, 1945
77	9611	Reestablishing the advisory board on Just Compensation	September 10, 1945
78	9612	Amending Executive Order 8902 Prescribing Regulations Pertaining to the Entry of Coffee Into the United States From Countries Signatories of the Inter-American Coffee Agreement	September 12, 1945
79	9613	Withdrawing and Reserving for the Use of the United States Lands Containing Radio-Active Mineral Substances	September 13, 1945
80	9614	Termination of the War Refugee Board	September 14, 1945
81	9615	Making Certain Time Limitations Imposed by Executive Order No. 4601 of March 1, 1927, Prescribing Regulations Pertaining to the Award of the Distinguished Flying Cross, Inapplicable in Certain Cases	September 14, 1945
82	9616	Relating to the United States High Commissioner to the Philippine Islands	September 14, 1945
83	9616-A	Creation of a Special Temporary Position in the Public Health Service	September 14, 1945
84	9617	Transfer of Certain Agencies and Functions to the Department of Labor	September 19, 1945
85	9618	Appointment of Edwin G. Arnold, Director, Division of Territories and Island Possessions, Department of the Interior, as Administrator of the Puerto Rico Reconstruction Administration	September 19, 1945
86	9619	Amending Subdivision VII of Schedule A of the Civil Service Rules	September 19, 1945
87	9620	Abolishing the Office of Economic Stabilization and Transferring its Functions to the Office of War Mobilization and Reconversion	September 20, 1945
88	9621	Termination of the Office of Strategic Services and Disposition of its Functions	September 20, 1945
89	9622	Revocation of Executive Order 9103 of March 18, 1942, Providing Uniform Control Over the Publication and Use of Federal Statistical Information Which Would Give Aid and Comfort to the Enemy	September 20, 1945
90	9623	Reinstating Leland B. Morris in the Foreign Service of the United States	September 20, 1945
91	9624	Reinstating Willys R. Peck in the Foreign Service of the United States	September 20, 1945
92	9625	Revoking Executive Order 9294 of January 4, 1943, Further Defining the Functions and Duties of the Office of Defense Transportation	September 21, 1945
93	9626	Appointment of the Member and Alternate Member for the United States of the International Military Tribunal Established for the Trial and Punishment of the Major War Criminals of the European Axis	September 24, 1945
94	9627	Amending Executive Order 9611 of September 10, 1945, Reestablishing the advisory board on Just Compensation	September 24, 1945
95	9628	Authorizing the Appointment to Positions of Contact Representative, Veterans Administration, Without Regard to the Requirements of the Civil Service Rules	September 25, 1945
96	9629	Amending Executive Order No. 9492, Prescribing Regulations Governing Non-Military and Non-Naval Transportation on Army and Navy Air Transports	September 25, 1945
97	9630	Redistribution of Foreign Economic Functions and Functions With Respect to Surplus Property in Foreign Areas	September 27, 1945
98	9631	Termination of the Office of Censorship	September 28, 1945
99	9632	Transfer of Jurisdiction From the War Department to the Department of the Interior Over the Interest of the United States in Certain Mineral Deposits in Jefferson Parish, Louisiana	September 28, 1945
100	9633	Reserving and Placing Certain Resources of the Continental Shelf Under the Control and Jurisdiction of the Secretary of the Interior	September 28, 1945
101	9634	Providing for the Establishment of Fishery Conservation Zones	September 28, 1945
102	9635	Organization of the Navy Department and the Naval Establishment	September 29, 1945
103	9636	Observance by Government Agencies of Holidays Falling on Sundays	October 3, 1945
104	9637	Medal for Merit	October 3, 1945
105	9638	Creating the Civilian Production Administration and Terminating the War Production Board	October 4, 1945
106	9639	Authorizing the Secretary of the Navy To Take Possession of and Operate Certain Plants and Facilities Used in the Transportation, Refining and Processing of Petroleum and Petroleum Products	October 4, 1945
107	9640	Creating an Emergency Board To Investigate the Disputes Between the Railway Express Agency, Inc., and Certain of its Employees	October 4, 1945
108	9641	Sale of Certain Combatant Vessels of the Navy	October 15, 1945
109	9642	Amendment of Executive Order 9356 of June 24, 1943, as Amended, Prescribing Regulations Governing the Furnishing of Clothing in Kind or Payment of Cash Allowances in Lieu Thereof to Enlisted Personnel of the Navy, the Coast Guard, the Naval Reserve, and the Coast Guard Reserve	October 18, 1945
110	9643	Transferring Certain Personnel, Records, Property, and Funds of the Department of Commerce, with Respect to Surplus Property, to the Reconstruction Finance Corporation	October 19, 1945
111	9644	Authorizing the Civil Service Commission to Confer a Competitive Classified Civil-Service Status Upon Certain Disabled Veterans	October 19, 1945
112	9645	Termination of the Authority Conferred by Executive Order No. 9489 of October 18, 1944	October 18, 1945
113	9646	Coat of Arms, Seal, and Flag of the President of the United States	October 25, 1945
114	9647	Regulations Relating to the Giving of Public Notice and the Presentation of Views in Connection with Foreign Trade Agreements	October 25, 1945
115	9648	Discontinuing the Matagorda Bay Defensive Sea Area	October 25, 1945
116	9649	Termination of the Office of Fishery Coordination	October 29, 1945
117	9650	Discontinuing Portland, Maine; Portsmouth, New Hampshire; Boston, Massachusetts; Narragansett Bay; New London, Connecticut; Chesapeake Bay-Norfolk; Charleston Harbor; and Buzzards Bay and Vineyard Sound Defensive Sea Area	October 29, 1945
118	9651	Amending Executive Order 9599, Providing for Assistance to Expanded Production and Continued Stabilization of the National Economy During the Transition from War to Peace, and for the Orderly Modification of Wartime Controls Over Prices, Wages, Materials and Facilities	October 30, 1945
119	9652	Authorizing the Appointment of Certain Personnel in the Department of State	October 31, 1945
120	9653	Amending Schedules A and B of the Civil Services Services Rules	November 1, 1945
121	9654	Adapting and Ratifying the Capture of the German Steamship Milwaukee	November 3, 1945
122	9655	Regulations Relating to Commissioned Officers and Employees of the Public Health Service	November 14, 1945
123	9656	Transfer of Shipbuilding Stabilization Committee	November 15, 1945
124	9657	Providing for the Representation of the United States in the Observation of Elections in Greece	November 16, 1945
125	9658	Possession, Control, and Operation of the Transportation System, Plants, and Facilities of the Capital Transit Company, Washington, District of Columbia	November 21, 1945
126	9659	Extension of Trust Periods on Indian Lands Expiring During Calendar Year 1946	November 21, 1945
127	9660	Conferring Certain Authority Upon the Chief of Counsel in the Preparation and Prosecution of Charges of War Crimes Against Major Leaders of Japan and Their Principal Agents and Accessories	November 29, 1945
128	9661	Possession, Control, and Operation of the Transportation System, Plants, and Facilities of the Great Lakes Towing Company, Cleveland, Ohio	November 29, 1945
129	9662	Restricting Competition in Certain Civil-Service Examinations to Veterans	November 29, 1945
130	9663	Creating an Emergency Board To Investigate a Dispute Between the Texas & New Orleans Railway Company and Hospital Association of the Southern Pacific Lines in Texas and Louisiana, and Certain of Its Employees	November 30, 1945
131	9664	Continuing the Work of the Fair Employment Practice Committee	December 18, 1945
132	9665	Transfer of the Functions of the Small War Plants Corporation to the Reconstruction Finance Corporation and the Department of Commerce	December 27, 1945
133	9666	Directing the Return of the Coast Guard to the Treasury Department	December 28, 1945
134	9667	Revoking Executive Order 9074 of February 25, 1942, Directing the Secretary of the Navy To Take Action Necessary To Protect Vessels, Harbors, Ports and Waterfront Facilities	December 28, 1945
135	9668	Amending Subdivision III of Schedule A of the Civil Service Rules	December 28, 1945
136	9669	Transfer of Air-Navigation Facilities and Functions in Iran From the War Department to the Administrator of Civil Aeronautics	December 28, 1945
137	9670	Establishing the Tennessee National Wildlife Refuge	December 28, 1945
138	9671	Restoring Certain Lands to the Territory of Hawaii	December 29, 1945
139	9672	Establishing the National Wage Stabilization Board and Terminating the National War Labor Board	December 31, 1945

=== 1946 ===
Relative No.	Absolute No.	Title / Description	Date signed
140	9673	Transfer of Certain Production Research and Development Functions From the Civilian Production Administration to the Department of Commerce	January 3, 1946
141	9674	Liquidation of War Agencies	January 4, 1946
142	9675	Creating an Emergency Board To Investigate the Disputes Between the St. Louis-San Francisco Railway Company and the St. Louis, San Francisco, and Texas Railway Company, Carriers, and Certain of Their Employees	January 5, 1946
143	9676	Terminal Date for Filing Application for Non-Necessity Certificate Under Section 124 (d) of the Internal Revenue Code	January 14, 1946
144	9677	Authorizing the Appointment of Certain Persons at the Home of Franklin D. Roosevelt National Historic Site, National Park Service, Without Regard to the Civil Service Rules	January 14, 1946
145	9678	Amendment of Executive Order No. 8743 of April 23, 1941, Extending the Classified Civil Service	January 14, 1946
146	9679	Amendment of Executive Order No. 9547 of May 2, 1945, Entitled Providing for Representation of the United States in Preparing and Prosecuting Charges of Atrocities and War Crimes Against the Leaders of the European Axis Powers and Their Principal Agents and Accessories	January 16, 1946
147	9680	Abolishing the United States of America Typhus Commission	January 17, 1946
148	9681	Designating the Honorable Jorge L. Cordova as Acting Judge of the District Court of the United States for Puerto Rico	January 17, 1946
149	9682	Providing for the Furnishing of Information and Assistance to the Joint Anglo-American Committee of Inquiry on Jewish Problems in Palestine and Europe	January 18, 1946
150	9683	Restoring Limitations Upon Punishments for Certain Violations of Articles of War 58, 59, 61 and 86	January 19, 1946
151	9684	Creating an Emergency Board To Investigate Disputes Between the Indiana Harbor Belt Railroad, Chicago Junction Railway (the C.R. & I.R.R. Co., Lesee) and Chicago River and Indiana Railroad Company, Carriers, and Certain of Their Employees	January 23, 1946
152	9685	Authorizing the Secretary of Agriculture To Take Possession of and Operate Certain Plants and Facilities Used in the Production, Processing, Transportation, Sale and Distribution of Livestock, Meat, Meat Products and By-Products	January 24, 1946
153	9686	Providing for the Administration by the Housing Expediter of Certain Functions Relating to Housing	January 26, 1946
154	9687	Revoking Executive Orders Concerning Foreign Service Pay Adjustment	January 26, 1946
155	9688	Amending Schedule B of the Civil Service Rules	January 31, 1946
156	9689	Consolidation of Surplus Property Functions	January 31, 1946
157	9690	Amending Executive Order 9685 Authorizing the Secretary of Agriculture To Take Possession of and Operate Certain Plants and Facilities Used in the Production, Processing, Transportation, Sale, and Distribution of Livestock, Meat, Meat Products and By-Products	February 2, 1946
158	9691	Directing the Civil Service Commission To Resume Operations Under the Civil Service Rules, and Authorizing the Adoption of Special Regulations During the Transitional Period	February 4, 1946
159	9692	Amending Executive Order 9472 of August 29, 1944, Establishing Certain Awards for the Merchant Marine	February 5, 1946
160	9693	Possession, Control, and Operation of the Transportation Systems, Plants, and Facilities of Certain Towing and Transportation Companies Operating in New York Harbor and Contiguous Waters	February 5, 1946
161	9694	Inspection of Income, Excess-Profits, and Declared Value Excess-Profits Tax Returns by the War Contracts Price Adjustment Board	February 6, 1946
162	9695	Revocation of Executive Order No. 9243 of September 12, 1942, Providing for the Transfer and Release of Federal Personnel	February 8, 1946
163	9696	Reinstating Monnett B. Davis in the Foreign Service of the United States	February 12, 1946
164	9697	Providing for the Continued Stabilization of the National Economy During the Transition from War to Peace	February 14, 1946
165	9698	Designating Public International Organizations Entitled to Enjoy Certain Privileges, Exemptions, and Immunities	February 19, 1946
166	9699	Re-Establishing the Office of Economic Stabilization	February 21, 1946
167	9700	Creating an Emergency Board To Investigate the Disputes Between the Texas & New Orleans Railroad Company, Carrier, and Certain of its Employees	March 1, 1946
168	9701	Providing for the Reservation of Rights to Fissionable Materials in Lands Owned by the United States	March 4, 1946
169	9702	Creating an Emergency Board To Investigate a Dispute Between the Alton Railroad Company and Other Carriers, and Certain of Their Employees	March 8, 1946
170	9703	Regulations Relating to the Medical Care of Certain Personnel of the Coast Guard, Coast and Geodetic Survey, Public Health Service, and Former Lighthouse Service	March 12, 1946
171	9704	Functions of the American Battle Monuments Commission	March 14, 1946
172	9705	Delegating Certain Functions and Authority Under the Agricultural Marketing Agreement Act of 1937 to the Economic Stabilization Director	March 15, 1946
173	9706	Amending Executive Order No. 9265 of November 6, 1942, Establishing the American, European-African-Middle Eastern and Asiatic-Pacific Campaign Medals	March 15, 1946
174	9707	Amendment of the Executive Order of January 31, 1946 Entitled Consolidation of Surplus property Functions	March 23, 1946
175	9708	Specifying Communicable Diseases for the Purpose of Regulations Providing for the Apprehension, Detention, or Conditional Release of Individuals To Prevent the Introduction, Transmission, or Spread of Communicable Diseases	March 26, 1946
176	9709	Providing Interim Arrangements Respecting Certain Air Navigation Facilities Abroad	March 29, 1946
177	9710	Terminating the Office of Inter-American Affairs and Transferring Certain of Its Functions	April 10, 1946
178	9711	Providing Reemployment Benefits for Federal Civilian Employees Who Enter Civilian Service With the War or Navy Departments in Occupied Areas	April 11, 1946
179	9712	Amendment of Executive Order No. 8743 of April 23, 1941, Extending the Classified Civil Service	April 13, 1946
180	9713	Creating an Emergency Board To Investigate a Dispute Between the Chicago, Rock Island & Pacific Railway Company and Certain of Its Employees	April 17, 1946
181	9714	Amending Executive Order No. 9492, as Amended, Prescribing Regulations Governing Non-Military and Non-Naval Transportation on Army and Navy Air Transports	April 20, 1946
182	9715	Death of Harlan Fiske Stone	April 23, 1946
183	9716	Creating an Emergency Board To Investigate a Dispute Between the Railway Express Agency, Inc., and Certain of Its Employees	April 24, 1946
184	9717	Directing the Emergency Board Created by Executive Order 9716 of April 24, 1946 To Investigate a Dispute Between the Railway Express Agency, Inc., and Certain of Its Employees, Also To Investigate Disputes Between the Agency and Certain Other of Its Employees	April 25, 1946
185	9718	Termination of the Petroleum Administration for War	May 3, 1946
186	9719	Creating an Emergency Board To Investigate Disputes Between the Transcontinental & Western Air, Inc., and Other Carriers, and Certain of Their Employees	May 7, 1946
187	9720	Discontinuing the Sitka and Subic Bay Naval Airspace Reservations and the Subic Bay, Manila Bay, Los Angeles-Long Beach Harbor, San Diego, San Francisco, Columbia River Entrance, and Strait of Juan de Fuca and Puget Sound Defensive Sea Areas	May 8, 1946
188	9721	Providing for the Transfer of Personnel to Public International Organizations in Which the United States Government Participates	May 10, 1946
189	9722	Reassignment of the Functions of Supply Command and the Commanding General, Services of Supply	May 13, 1946
190	9723	Termination of the President's War Relief Control Board	May 14, 1946
191	9724	Amendment of Executive Order No. 9672, Establishing the National Wage Stabilization Board	May 15, 1946
192	9725	Designating the Alien Property Custodian To Administer the Powers and Authority Conferred Upon the President by Sections 20 and 32 of the Trading With the Enemy Act, as Amended	May 16, 1946
193	9726	Transfer of Fiscal Functions Relating to Lend-Lease Matters From the Department of State to the Treasury Department	May 17, 1946
194	9727	Possession, Control, and Operation of Certain Railroads	May 17, 1946
195	9728	Authorizing the Secretary of the Interior To Take Possession of and To Operate Certain Coal Mines	May 21, 1946
196	9729	Further Defining the Functions and Duties of the Office of Defense Transportation	May 23, 1946
197	9730	Amendment of Executive Order No. 9630 of September 27, 1945, Redistributing Foreign Economic Functions and Functions With Respect to Surplus Property in Foreign Affairs	May 24, 1946
198	9731	Creating an Emergency Board To Investigate a Dispute Between the Hudson & Manhattan Railroad Company and Certain of Its Employees	May 29, 1946
199	9732	Relating to the Administration of the Act of February 22, 1935, as Amended	June 3, 1946
200	9733	Authorizing Certification for Probational Appointment of Certain Classes of Persons	June 4, 1946
201	9734	President's Certificate of Merit	June 6, 1946
202	9735	Establishing a Cabinet Committee on Palestine and Related Problems	June 11, 1946
203	9736	Possession, Control, and Operation of the Transportation System, Plants, and Facilities of the Monongahela Connecting Railroad Company	June 14, 1946
204	9737	Revoking Section 3 of Executive Order 9328 of April 8, 1943, Relating to the Stabilization of Wages, Prices, and Salaries	June 17, 1946
205	9738	Restricting Competition in Examination for the Position of Correctional Officer Under the Bureau of Prisons, Department of Justice	June 19, 1946
206	9739	Prescribing Regulations Governing the Payment of Expenses of Transportation of Civilian Officers and Employees Transferred Incident to the Return of Departmental Functions to the Seat of Government	June 20, 1946
207	9740	Amendment of Executive Order No. 1888 of February 2, 1914, as Amended, Relating to Conditions of Employment in the Service of the Panama Canal and the Panama Railroad Company on the Isthmus of Panama	June 20, 1946
208	9741	Extending the Existence of the Quetico-Superior Committee, Created by Executive Order No. 6793, of June 30, 1934	June 25, 1946
209	9742	Termination and Liquidation of the War Relocation Authority	June 25, 1946
210	9743	Regulations Governing the Payment of Expenses of Transportation of the Immediate Families of Civilian Officers and Employees of the Government, Fiscal Year, 1947	June 26, 1946
211	9744	Termination of the Office of the Director of Liquidation	June 27, 1946
212	9744-A	Transferring the Review Committee on Deferment of Government Employees to the Office of War Mobilization and Reconversion	June 29, 1946
213	9744-B	Regulations Governing the Furnishing of Clothing in Kind or Payment of Cash Allowances in Lieu Thereof to Enlisted Personnel of the Navy, the Coast Guard, the Naval Reserve, and the Coast Guard Reserve	June 29, 1946
214	9744-C	Amending Executive Order No. 9561 of June 1, 1945, Prescribing Regulations Governing the Granting of Allowances for Quarters and Subsistence to Enlisted Men	June 29, 1946
215	9745	Providing for the Interim Administration of Certain Continuing Functions of the Office of Price Administration	June 30, 1946
216	9746	Authorizing the Secretary of War and the Governor of the Panama Canal To Perform Certain Functions Relating to the Panama Canal and the Canal Zone	July 1, 1946
217	9747	Continuing the Functions of the Alien Property Custodian and the Department of the Treasury in the Philippines	July 3, 1946
218	9748	Creating an Emergency Board To Investigate a Dispute Between the Northwest Airlines, Inc., and Certain of its Employees	July 3, 1946
219	9749	Creating an Emergency Board To Investigate a Dispute Between the Denver & Rio Grande Western Railroad Company and Certain of its Employees	July 10, 1946
220	9750	Excluding From the Provisions of the Classification Act of 1923, as Amended, Positions of Persons Whose Employment in Government Hospitals is on a Student-Training or Resident-Training Basis	July 10, 1946
221	9751	Designating Public International Organizations Entitled To Enjoy Certain Privileges, Exemptions, and Immunities	July 11, 1946
222	9752	Restoring Certain Land to the Territory of Hawaii for Use of the City and County of Honolulu	July 15, 1946
223	9753	Authorizing the Appointment of Ellen S. Woodward to a Position as Director of Inter-Agency Relations in the Federal Security Agency Without Regard to Civil Service Rules	July 16, 1946
224	9754	Authorizing the Appointment of Jewell Wood Swofford to a Position as Commissioner for Special Services in the Federal Security Agency Without Regard to Civil Service Rules	July 16, 1946
225	9755	Authorizing the Appointment of Hattie W. Caraway to a Position as Member of the Employees' Compensation Appeal Board in the Federal Security Agency Without Regard to Civil Service Rules	July 16, 1946
226	9756	Authorizing the Appointment of George E. Bigge to a Position as Director of Federal-State Relations in the Federal Security Agency Without Regard to Civil Service Rules	July 16, 1946
227	9757	Authorizing the Appointment of Arthur J. Altmeyer to a Position as Commissioner for Social Security in the Federal Security Agency Without Regard to Civil Service Rules	July 16, 1946
228	9758	Authorizing the Secretary of the Interior To Take Possession of and To Operate Certain Coal Mines	July 19, 1946
229	9759	Suspending Certain Statutory Provisions Relating to Employment in the Canal Zone	July 22, 1946
230	9760	Conferring Certain Authority Upon the Secretary of State With Regard to Diplomatic and Consular Property of Germany and Japan Within the United States	July 23, 1946
231	9761	Preservation and Display of Enemy Flags Captured by the Navy and the Coast Guard	July 23, 1946
232	9762	Transferring the Functions of the Office of Economic Stabilization to the Office of War Mobilization and Reconversion	July 25, 1946
233	9763	Creating an Emergency Board To Investigate a Dispute Between the Pullman Company and Certain of its Employees	July 27, 1946
234	9764	Inspection of Income, Excess-Profits, Declared Value Excess-Profits, and Capital Stock Tax Returns by the Special Committee Established Pursuant to Senate Resolution 71, Seventy-Seventh Congress, First Session, To Investigate the Operation of the National-Defense Program	July 29, 1946
235	9765	Authorizing the Appointment of Albert H. Lander, Jr., to a Position as Member of the Employees' Compensation Appeal Board in the Federal Security Agency Without Regard to Civil Service Rules	July 29, 1946
236	9766	Authorizing the Detail of an Army Officer for Military Duty With the Institute of Inter-American Affairs and the Inter-American Educational Foundation	July 31, 1946
237	9767	Amending the Foreign Service Regulations of the United States	August 9, 1946
238	9768	Extending the Provisions of Executive Order 9177 of May 30, 1942, to the Secretary of Commerce	August 9, 1946
239	9769	Amendment of the Regulations Governing the Appointment of Postmasters of the Fourth Class	August 14, 1946
240	9770	Creating an Emergency Board To Investigate a dispute Between the Long Island Railroad Company and Certain of its Employees	August 22, 1946
241	9771	Transferring the Use, Possession, and Control of Certain Lands to the Tennessee Valley Authority	August 24, 1946
242	9772	Restoring Limitations Upon Punishments for Certain Violations of Articles of War 58, 59, 61 and 86, as to Offenses Committed in Occupied Enemy Territory	August 24, 1946
243	9773	Disposal of the U.S.S. Layfayette (APV-4. Ex-Normandie)	September 3, 1946
244	9774	Designating the Reconstruction Finance Corporation as the Agency To Act With Respect to Certain Bonds, Notes, and Other Securities Acquired on Behalf of the United States Under the Provisions of the Transportation Act, 1920	September 3, 1946
245	9775	Establishing the Federal Committee on Highway Safety	September 3, 1946
246	9776	Reopening East Executive Avenue to Public Travel	September 5, 1946
247	9777	Designating the Honorable A. Cecil Snyder as Acting Judge of the District Court of the United States for Puerto Rico	September 5, 1946
248	9778	Regulations Governing Travel and Transportation Expenses of New Appointees to Positions in the Government Service Located Outside the United States and Such Expenses of Employees Returning to the United States	September 10, 1946
249	9779	Authorizing the Appointment of Robert J. Barrett to a Position as captain in the Metropolitan Police Force of the District of Columbia Without Regard to the Civil Service Rules	September 18, 1946
250	9780	Exemption of Certain Officers of the Executive Branch of the Government From Compulsory Retirement for Age	September 19, 1946
251	9781	Establishing the Air Coordinating Committee	September 19, 1946
252	9782	Creating an Emergency Board To Investigate a Dispute Between the Utah Idaho Central Railroad Corporation and Certain of its Employees	September 23, 1946
253	9783	Revocation of Executive Order No. 7744, Authorizing the Solicitor of the Department of Labor To Act as Secretary of Labor	September 23, 1946
254	9784	Providing for the More Efficient Use and for the Transfer and Other Disposition of Government Records	September 25, 1946
255	9785	Amendment of Executive Order 9744B of June 19, 1946, Prescribing Regulations Governing the Furnishing of Clothing in Kind or Payment of Cash Allowances in lieu Thereof to Enlisted Personnel of the Navy, the Coast Guard, the Naval Reserve, and the Coast Guard Reserve	October 1, 1946
256	9786	Regulations Governing the Consideration, Adjustment, and Settlement of Claims Under Public Law 657, Approved August 7, 1946	October 5, 1946
257	9787	Amendment of Executive Order No. 7747 of November 20, 1937, as Amended, Establishing the San Clemente Island Naval Defensive Sea Area	October 5, 1946
258	9788	Terminating the Office of Alien Property Custodian and Transferring its Function to the Attorney General	October 14, 1946
259	9789	Establishing the Philippine Alien Property Administration and Defining its Functions	October 14, 1946
260	9790	Amending Executive Order No. 7926 of July 7, 1938, Establishing the Wheeler Migratory Waterfowl Refuge	October 14, 1946
261	9791	Providing for a Study of Scientific Research and Development Activities and Establishing the President's Scientific Research Board	October 17, 1946
262	9792	Amending Executive Order No. 9492, as Amended, Prescribing Regulations Governing Non-Military and Non-Naval Transportation on Army and Navy Air Transports	October 23, 1946
263	9793	Creating an Emergency Board To Investigate Disputes Between the Atlanta & St. Andrews Bay Railway Company and Other Carriers, and Certain of Their Employees	October 25, 1946
264	9794	Designating the Solicitor of the Department of the Interior To Act as Under Secretary or Assistant Secretary of the Interior	October 28, 1946
265	9795	Restoring Certain Lands to the Jurisdiction of the Territory of Hawaii	October 26, 1946
266	9796	Amendment of Executive Order No. 9761 of July 23, 1946, Providing for the Preservation and Display of Enemy Flags Captured by the Navy and Coast Guard	October 31, 1946
267	9797	Transferring to the Department of Commerce Certain Functions Relating to Air-Navigation Facilities Outside the Continental United States	November 6, 1946
268	9798	Creating an Emergency Board To Investigate the Dispute Between the Barre & Chelsea Railroad Company and the St. Johnsbury & Lake Champlain Railroad Company and Certain of Their Employees	November 6, 1946
269	9799	Authorizing the Secretary of State To Exercise the Authority of the President To Classify Positions Occupied by Chiefs of Mission	November 8, 1946
270	9800	Authorizing the Appointment of Mrs. Mary L. Hoffman to a Civilian Position at the Naval Power Factory, Indian Head, Maryland, Without Compliance With the Civil Service Rules	November 8, 1946
271	9801	Removing Wage and Salary Controls Adopted Pursuant to the Stabilization Act of 1942	November 9, 1946
272	9802	Terminal Date for Filing Application for Payment Certificate Under Section 124 (h) of the Internal Revenue Code	November 12, 1946
273	9803	Creating an Emergency Board To Investigate a Dispute Between the Lehigh Valley Railroad Company and Certain of its Employees	November 16, 1946
274	9804	Revoking Executive Orders No. 2463 of September 29, 1916, and No. 4182 of March 24, 1925, Relating to Administration of Employees' Compensation Act With Respect to Employees of the Alaska Railroad, and Placing the Administration of that Act as to Such Employees in the Federal Security Agency	November 21, 1946
275	9805	Regulations Governing Payment of Travel and Transportation Expenses of Civilian Officers and Employees of the United States When Transferred From One Official Station to Another for Permanent Duty	November 25, 1946
276	9806	Establishing the President's Temporary Commission on Employee Loyalty	November 25, 1946
277	9807	Authorizing the Civil Service Commission To Confer a Competitive Civil Service Status Upon Certain Groups of Employees	November 29, 1946
278	9808	Establishing the President's Committee on Civil Rights	December 5, 1946
279	9809	Providing for the Disposition of Certain War Agencies	December 12, 1946
280	9810	Excusing Federal Employees From Duty One-Half Day on December 24, 1946	December 12, 1946
281	9811	Extension of Trust Periods on Indian Lands Expiring During the Calendar Year 1947	December 17, 1946
282	9812	Inspection of Income, Excess-Profits, and Declared Value Excess-Profits Tax Returns by the Committee on Naval Affairs, House of Representatives	December 19, 1946
283	9813	Appointment of the Members and the Alternate Member of a Military Tribunal Established for the Trail and Punishment of Major War Criminals in Germany	December 20, 1946
284	9814	Establishing an Amnesty Board To Review Convictions of Persons Under the Selective Training and Service Act of 1940 and To Make Recommendations for Executive Clemency With Respect Thereto	December 23, 1946
285	9815	Amending Section 7 of Executive Order No. 9691 of February 4, 1946, Entitled Directing the Civil Service Commission to Resume Operations Under the Civil Rules, and Authorizing the Adoption of Special Regulations During the Transitional Period	December 23, 1946
286	9816	Providing for the Transfer of Properties and Personnel to the Atomic Energy Commission	December 31, 1946
287	9817	Regulations Governing Awards to Federal Employees for Meritorious Suggestions and for Exceptional or Meritorious Service	December 31, 1946

=== 1947 ===
Relative No.	Absolute No.	Title / Description	Date signed
288	9818	Establishing the Philippine Alien Property Administration and Defining Its Functions	January 1, 1947
289	9819	Appointment of the Members and the Alternate Member of a Military Tribunal Established for the Trial and Punishment of Major War Criminals in Germany	January 10, 1947
290	9820	Segregation of the Functions of the Housing Expediter from the Functions of the National Housing Administrator	January 11, 1947
291	9821	Amending 9070 of February 24, 1942, Consolidating the Housing Agencies and Functions of the Government into the National Housing Agency	January 11, 1947
292	9822	Disposal of Certain Finnish Merchant Vessels to the Former Owners Thereof	January 13, 1947
293	9823	Designating Public International Organizations Entitled To Enjoy Certain Privileges, Exemptions, and Immunities	January 24, 1947
294	9824	Amending 9154 of May 1, 1942, Authorizing Certain Exclusions from the Operations of the Civil Service Retirement Act of May 29, 1930	January 28, 1947
295	9825	Amending 9386 of October 15, 1943, Prescribing Regulations Governing the Granting of Allowances for Quarters and Subsistence to Enlisted Men	January 30, 1947
296	9826	Designating the Honorable A. Cecil Snyder as Acting Judge of the District Court of the United States for Puerto Rico	January 31, 1947
297	9827	Appointment of the Members and the Alternate Members of the Military Tribunal Established for the Trial and Punishment of Major War Criminals in Germany	February 21, 1947
298	9828	Transferring the Surplus Property Office of the Department of the Interior to the War Assets Administration	February 21, 1947
299	9829	Extension of the Provisions of 9177 of May 30, 1942, to the U.S. Atomic Energy Commission	February 21, 1947
300	9830	Amending the Civil Service Rules and Providing for Federal Personnel Administration	February 24, 1947
301	9831	Abolishing the Board of War Communications	1947-02-24
302	9832	Prescribing Procedures for the Administration of the Reciprocal Trade Agreements Program	1947-02-25
303	9833	Inspection of Income, Excess-Profits, Declared Value Excess-Profits, and Capital Stock Tax Returns by Federal Trade Commission	1947-03-07
304	9834	Regulations Governing the Payment of Expenses of Transportation of Civilian Officers and Employees Transferred Incident to the Return of Departmental Functions to the Seat of Government	1947-03-20
305	9835	Prescribing Procedures for the Administration of an Employees Loyalty Program in the Executive Branch of the Government	1947-03-21
306	9836	Vesting Certain Functions and Authority With Respect to the Veterans' Emergency Housing Program in the Housing Expediter	1947-03-22
307	9837	Regulations Governing the Transfer of Leave Between the Foreign Service and Other Government Agencies	1947-03-27
308	9838	Creating an Emergency Board To Investigate Disputes Between the Grand Trunk Western Railroad Company, Pere Marquette Railway Company, Wabash Railroad Company, Ann Arbor Railroad Company, and Certain of Their Employees	1947-03-28
309	9839	Transferring to the Federal Works Administrator Certain Functions, Powers, and Duties Relating to the Grand River Dam Project (PWA Docket Oklahoma 1097-P-DS)	1947-04-14
310	9840	Amending 9492, as Amended, Prescribing Regulations Governing Non-Military and Non-Naval Transportation on Army and Navy Air Transports	1947-04-22
311	9841	Termination of the Office of Temporary Controls	1947-04-23
312	9842	Conduct of Certain Litigation Arising Under Wartime Legislation	1947-04-23
313	9843	Authorizing the Secretary of the Navy To Transfer Certain Vessels and Material and To Furnish Certain Assistance to the Republic of China	1947-04-29
314	9844	Designating the United States Mission to the United Nations and Providing for its Direction and Administration	1947-04-28
315	9845	Amendment of 9 of January 17, 1873, Relating to the Holding of State or Local Offices by Federal Officers and Employees	1947-04-28
316	9846	Amendment of 9195 of July 7, 1942, Prescribing Regulations Relating to Aerial Flights by Personnel of the Army, Navy, Marine Corps, Coast Guard, and National Guard	1947-05-05
317	9847	Liquidation of the Solid Fuels Administration for War	1947-05-06
318	9848	Disposal of Certain Foreign Merchant Vessels	1947-05-08
319	9849	Suspension of Eight-Hour Law as to Work by the Alaska Railroad, Department of the Interior	1947-05-09
320	9850	Amendment of 9460 of August 7, 1944, Prescribing Regulations Relating to Glider Flights by Personnel of the Army, Navy, Marine Corps, and Coast Guard	1947-05-10
321	9851	Adding Certain Lands to the Mount Vernon Memorial Highway	1947-05-13
322	9852	Appointment of a Member of a Military Tribunal Established for the Trial and Punishment of Major War Criminals in Germany	1947-05-15
323	9853	Regulations Governing the Payment of Actual and Necessary Expenses, or Per Diem in Lieu Thereof, to Commissioned Officers of the Coast and Geodetic Survey on Duty Outside the Continental United States or in Alaska	1947-05-15
324	9854	Transferring a Portion of the Phoenix Indian School Reserve at Phoenix, Arizona, to the Control and Jurisdiction of the Veterans' Administration	1947-05-16
325	9855	Creating an Emergency Board To Investigate a Dispute Between the Bingham and Garfield Railway Company and Certain of its Employees	1947-05-16
326	9856	Authorizing Appointment of Samuel M. Sampler to a Position in the Classified Service Without Regard to the Civil Service Rules	1947-05-19
327	9857	Regulations for Carrying Out the Provisions of the Act Entitled "An Act To Provide for Assistance to Greece and Turkey"	1947-05-22
328	9857-A	Medal for Merit	1947-05-27
329	9857-B	Amendment of 9734 of June 6, 1946, Establishing the President's Certificate of Merit	1947-05-27
330	9858	Appointment of the Members and the Alternate Member of a Military Tribunal Established for the Trial and Punishment of Major War Criminals in Germany	1947-05-31
331	9859	Revoking 9196 of July 9, 1942	1947-05-31
332	9860	Restoring Certain Land, and Granting an Easement in Certain Other Land, to the Territory of Hawaii	1947-05-31
333	9861	Restoring Certain Lands of the Fort Armstrong Military Reservation to the Use of the Territory of Hawaii	1947-05-31
334	9862	Providing for the Transfer of Personnel to the American Mission for Aid to Greece and the American Mission for Aid to Turkey	1947-05-31
335	9863	Designating Public International Organizations Entitled To Enjoy Certain Privileges, Exemptions, and Immunities	1947-05-31
336	9864	Regulations for Carrying Out the Provisions of the Joint Resolution Entitled "Joint Resolution Providing for Relief Assistance to the People of Countries Devastated by War"	1947-05-31
337	9865	Providing for the Protection Abroad of Inventions Resulting From Research Financed by the Government	1947-06-14
338	9866	Designation of Officers To Act as Secretary of the Interior	1947-06-14
339	9867	Amending 9492, as Amended, Prescribing Regulations Governing Non-Military and Non-Naval Transportation on Army and Navy Air Transports	1947-06-23
340	9868	Appointment of Members of a Military Tribunal Established for the Trial and Punishment of Major War Criminals in Germany	1947-06-24
341	9869	Amendment of 9744B of June 29, 1946, Prescribing Regulations Governing the Furnishing of Clothing in Kind or Payment of Cash Allowances in Lieu Thereof to Enlisted Personnel of the Navy, the Coast Guard, the Naval Reserve, and the Coast Guard Reserve	1947-06-30
342	9870	Regulations Pertaining to the Granting of and Accounting for Certain Foreign Service Allowances and Allotments	1947-07-08
343	9871	Regulations Governing the Granting of Allowances for Quarters and Subsistence to Enlisted Men of the Army, Navy, Marine Corps, and Coast Guard, and Per Diem Allowances to Members of Such Services and Coast and Geodetic Survey and Public Health Service on Duty Outside the Continental United States or in Alaska	1947-07-08
344	9872	Amendment of 7658, Restoring to the Territory of Hawaii a Portion of the Fort De Russy Military Reservation	1947-07-15
345	9873	Transferring to the American Battle Monuments Commission the Functions of the War Department Pertaining to the Administration of the Mexico City National Cemetery	1947-07-16
346	9874	Creating an Emergency Board To Investigate Disputes Between the Southern Pacific Company (Pacific Lines), the Northwestern Pacific Railroad Company, and the San Diego & Arizona Eastern Railway Company, and Certain of Their Employees	1947-07-18
347	9875	Providing an Interim Administration for the Trust Territory of the Pacific Islands	1947-07-18
348	9876	Authorizing the Philippine Alien Property Administrator To Perform Certain Functions of the President With Respect to Alien Property Located in the Philippines	1947-07-24
349	9877	Functions of the Armed Forces	1947-07-24
350	9878	Creating an Emergency Board To Investigate a Dispute Between the Terminal Railroad Association of St. Louis and Certain of its Employees	1947-07-31
351	9879	Designating the Honorable Borinquen Marrero as Acting Judge of the District Court of the United States for Puerto Rico	1947-07-31
352	9880	Creating an Emergency Board To Investigate a Dispute Between the River Terminal Railway Company and Certain of its Employees	1947-08-01
353	9881	Discontinuing the Palmyra Island Naval Airspace Reservation and the Palmyra Island Naval Defensive Sea Area	1947-08-04
354	9882	Appointment of the Members of a Military Tribunal Established for the Trial and Punishment of Major War Criminals in Germany	1947-08-07
355	9883	Revoking 9172 of May 22, 1942, Establishing a Panel for the Creation of Emergency Boards for the Adjustment of Railway Labor Disputes	1947-08-11
356	9884	Restoring Certain Land to the Jurisdiction of the Territory of Hawaii	1947-08-13
357	9885	Designation of the Assistant Secretaries of Commerce and Solicitor of Commerce To Act as Secretary of Commerce	1947-08-18
358	9886	Amending 9492, as Amended, Prescribing Regulations Governing Non-Military and Non-Naval Transportation on Army and Navy Air Transports	1947-08-22
359	9887	Designating Public International Organizations Entitled To Enjoy Certain Privileges, Exemptions, and Immunities	1947-08-22
360	9888	Suspending Certain Statutory Provisions Relating to Employment in the Canal Zone	1947-08-26
361	9889	Restricting Competition to Veterans in Examination for the Position of Substitute Railway Postal Clerk	1947-08-28
362	9890	Amending 6783 the Creating Quetico-Superior Committee	1947-09-06
363	9891	Creating an Emergency Board To Investigate a Dispute Between the Railway Express Agency, Inc., and Certain of its Employees	1947-09-15
364	9892	Designating the Fish and Wildlife Service as the Agency Responsible for the Enforcement of the Sockeye Salmon Fishery Act of 1947	1947-09-20
365	9893	Authorizing the Civil Service Commission To Confer a Competitive Status Upon Mrs.. Charlotte Gladden Without Compliance With the Competitive Provisions of the Civil Service Rules	1947-09-20
366	9894	Discontinuing the San Clemente Island Naval Defensive Sea Area	1947-09-23
367	9895	Exemption of Certain Officers of the Executive Branch of the Government from Compulsory Retirement for Age	1947-09-30
368	9896	Display of the Flag of the United States at Half-Mast To Honor the Return of World War II Dead from Overseas	October 2, 1947
369	9897	Amendments to Regulations Relating to Commissioned Officers and Employees of the Public Health Service	1947-10-10
370	9898	Suspension of the Eight-Hour Law as to Laborers and Mechanics Employed by the Departments of the Army and the Air Force on Certain Public Works	1947-10-14
371	9899	Creating an Emergency Board To Investigate a Dispute Between the Atlanta & West Point Rail Road Company and the Western Railway of Alabama and Certain of Their Employees	1947-10-15
372	9900	Creating an Emergency Board To Investigate a Dispute Between the Railway Express Agency, Inc., and Certain of its Employees	October 21, 1947
373	9901	Appointment of James P. Davis, Director, Division of Territories and Island Possessions, Department of the Interior, as Administrator of the Puerto Rico Reconstruction Administration	October 25, 1947
374	9902	Establishing a Seal for the Department of the Air Force	November 1, 1947
375	9903	Termination of Duty-Free Admission of War Materials Purchased by Certain Agencies	November 12, 1947
376	9904	Amending Paragraph 8 of 9635 of September 29, 1945, Prescribing the Order of Succession of Officers Authorized To Act as Secretary of the Navy	November 13, 1947
377	9905	Designating the Membership of the National Security Resources Board and Defining the Functions, Duties, and Authority of the chairman of the Board	November 13, 1947
378	9906	Revocation of 7165 of August 29, 1935, Relating to the Preparation and Publicity of Decisions in Respect of Overassessments of Income, Profits, Estate, and Gifts Taxes Allowed in Excess of $20,000	November 18, 1947
379	9907	Excusing Federal Employees From Duty One-Half Day on December 24, 1947	December 2, 1947
380	9908	Reservation of Source Material in Certain Lands Owned by the United States	December 5, 1947
381	9909	Exempting the District Court of the United States for Puerto Rico and the Department of Justice from Making the Reports Provided for by Section 49b (2) of the Organic Act of Puerto Rico, as Amended	December 9, 1947
382	9910	Creating an Emergency Board To Investigate a Dispute Between the Georgia Railroad and the Brotherhood of Locomotive Firemen and Enginemen	December 16, 1947
383	9911	Designating the International Cotton Advisory Committee as a Public International Organization Entitled To Enjoy Certain Privileges, Exemptions, and Immunities	December 19, 1947
384	9912	Establishing the Interdepartmental Committee on Scientific Research and Development	December 24, 1947
385	9913	Terminating the Office of Scientific Research and Development and Providing for the Completion of its Liquidation	December 26, 1947
386	9914	Providing for the Administration of the Foreign Aid Act of 1947	December 26, 1947
387	9915	Delegating to the Secretary of Agriculture the Authority Vested in the President by Section 4 (b) of the Joint Resolution Approved December 30, 1947	December 30, 1947
388	9916	Amendment of 6868 of October 9, 1934, as Amended, Designating Members of the National Capital Housing Authority	December 31, 1947
389	9917	Appointment of Members and Alternate Members of Military Tribunals Established for the Trial and Punishment of Major War Criminals in Germany	December 31, 1947
390	9918	Creating an Emergency Board To Investigate Disputes Between the Alabama, Tennessee and Northern Railroad Company and Other Carriers, and Certain of Their Employees	December 31, 1947

=== 1948 ===
Relative No.	Absolute No.	Title / Description	Date signed
391	9919	Delegating Authority and Establishing Procedures Under the Joint Resolution Approved December 30, 1947	January 3, 1948
392	9920	Extension of Trust Periods on Indian Lands Expiring During the Calendar Year 1948	January 8, 1948
393	9921	Authorizing the Philippine Alien Property Administrator To Transfer Certain Property to the Republic of the Philippines	January 10, 1948
394	9922	Creating an Emergency Board To Investigate a Dispute Between the Chicago, North Shore & Milwaukee Railway Company and Certain of its Employees	January 13, 1948
395	9923	Creating an Emergency Board To Investigate a Dispute Between the Akron & Barberton Belt Railroad and Certain of its Employees	January 13, 1948
396	9924	Designating the Honorable Martin Travieso as Acting Judge of the District Court of the United States for Puerto Rico	January 13, 1948
397	9925	Establishing Airspace Reservations Over Certain Facilities of the United States Atomic Energy Commission	January 17, 1948
398	9926	Amendment of Executive Order No. 9898, Suspending the Eight-Hour Law as to Laborers and Mechanics Employed by the Departments of the Army and the Air Force on Certain Public Works	January 17, 1948
399	9927	Restoring Certain Lands to the Jurisdiction of the Territory of Hawaii	January 17, 1948
400	9928	Suspending Professional Examinations for Permanent Promotion of Officers in the Medical Department of the Army	January 21, 1948
401	9929	Creating an Emergency Board To Investigate a Dispute Between the Akron, Caton & Youngstown Railroad Company and Other Carriers, and Certain of Their Employees	1948-01-27
402	9930	Authorizing and Directing the Publication of the 1949 Edition of the Code of Federal Regulations	1948-02-04
403	9931	Amendment of Executive Order No. 9905, Designating the Membership of the National Security Resources Board	1948-02-19
404	9932	Acquisition of Competitive Status and Reemployment of Certain Persons Appointed or Assigned to the Foreign Service	1948-02-27
405	9933	Amending Executive Order No. 9805 Prescribing Regulations Governing Payment of Travel and Transportation Expenses of Civilian Officers and Employees of the United States When Transferred From One Official Station to Another for Permanent Duty	1948-02-27
406	9934	Creating a Board of Inquiry To Report on a Labor Dispute Affecting the Operation of Atomic Energy Facilities	1948-03-05
407	9934-A	Creating a Board of Inquiry To Report on a Labor Dispute Affecting the Meat-Packing Industry of the United States	1948-03-15
408	9935	Directing the Transfer of Certain Vessels to the Government of Italy	1948-03-16
409	9936	Creating an Emergency Board To Investigate a Dispute Between the Terminal Railroad Association of St. Louis and Certain of its Employees	1948-03-18
410	9937	Authorizing the Agencies Participating in the Philippine Rehabilitation Program To Exercise the Authority Vested in the President by Section 4 of the Philippine Property Act of 1946	1948-03-20
411	9938	Revoking Executive Order No. 9544 of April 25, 1945, Authorizing the Secretary of War To Assume Control of a Certain Airport	1945-03-22
412	9939	Creating a Board of Inquiry To Report on a Labor Dispute Affecting the Bituminous Coal Industry of the United States	1948-03-23
413	9940	Creating an Emergency Board To Investigate a Dispute Between the Railway Express Agency, Inc., and Certain of its Employees	1948-03-25
414	9941	Authorizing the Secretary of State To Prescribe Rules and Regulations Relating to the Foreign Service Retirement and Disability System	1948-03-26
415	9942	Providing for the Performance of Certain Functions Under the Rubber Act of 1948	1948-04-01
416	9943	Providing for Carrying Out the Foreign Assistance Act of 1948	1948-04-09
417	9944	Authorizing the Department of State To Administer Certain Functions Under the Foreign Assistance Act of 1948	1948-04-09
418	9945	Further Amending Executive Order No. 9154 of May 1, 1942, Authorizing Certain Exclusions From the Operation of the Civil Service Retirement Act of May 29, 1930, as Amended	1948-04-09
419	9946	Regulations Governing Allowances for Actual Transportation Expenses in Excess of the Lowest First-Class Rate in Certain Cases	1948-04-10
420	9947	Creating an Emergency Board To Investigate a Dispute Between the Pennsylvania Railroad and Certain of its Employees	1948-04-10
421	9948	Creating an Emergency Board To Investigate a Dispute Between the Aliquippa and Southern Railroad Company and Certain of its Employees	1948-04-10
422	9949	Modifying Executive Order No. 9721, Providing for the Transfer of Personnel to Certain Public International Organizations	1948-04-17
423	9950	Revoking Executive Order No. 9877 of July 26, 1947, Prescribing the Functions of the Armed Forces	1948-04-21
424	9951	Restoring Certain Land of the Kuwili Park Military Reservation to the Jurisdiction of the Territory of Hawaii	1948-04-21
425	9952	Termination of Reemployment Rights of Federal Civilian Employees Who Transferred to Public or Private Agencies for National-Defense or War Work	1948-04-22
426	9953	Establishing the Interdepartmental Committee for the Peacetime Voluntary Payroll Savings Plans for the Purchase of United States Savings Bonds	1948-04-23
427	9954	Exemption of John Monroe Johnson From Compulsory Retirement for Age	1948-04-26
428	9955	Regulations Pertaining to Promotions to Certain Grades in the Regular Corps of the Public Health Service	1948-05-06
429	9956	Exemption of Harry B. Mitchell From Compulsory Retirement for Age	1948-05-06
430	9957	Possession, Control, and Operation of Railroads	1948-05-10
431	9958	Creating an Emergency Board To Investigate a Dispute Between the National Airlines, Inc., and Certain of its Employees	1948-05-15
432	9959	Creating a Board of Inquiry To Report on a Labor Dispute Affecting the Communications Industry of the United States	1948-05-18
433	9960	Providing for the Administration of Aid and Relief for the People of Certain Countries	1948-05-19
434	9961	Directing the Civil Service Commission To Make Determinations With Respect to the Reemployment Rights of Persons Who Left the Federal Service To Serve in the Armed Forces or the Merchant Marine	1948-05-19
435	9962	Regulations Governing the Payment of Salaries and Compensations of Federal Employees Outside the Continental United States or in Alaska	1948-05-24
436	9963	Exemption of Samuel B. Hill From Compulsory Retirement for Age	1948-05-28
437	9964	Creating a Board of Inquiry To Report on Certain Labor Disputes Affecting the Maritime Industry of the United States	1948-06-03
438	9965	Creating an Emergency Board To Investigate Certain Disputes Between the National Airlines, Inc., and Certain of Its Employees	1948-06-03
439	9966	Exemption of Carroll Miller From Compulsory Retirement for Age	1948-06-04
440	9967	Designation of Certain Officers To Act as Secretary of Agriculture	1948-06-12
441	9968	Designation of Certain Officers To Act as Secretary of Labor	1948-06-17
442	9969	Suspension of Eight-Hour Law as to Work by the Alaska Railroad, Department of the Interior	1948-06-19
443	9970	Creating a Board of Inquiry To Report on a Labor Dispute Affecting the Bituminous Coal Industry of the United States	1948-06-19
444	9971	Creating an Emergency Board To Investigate Disputes Between Certain Transportation Systems Operated by the Secretary of the Army and Certain Workers	1948-06-23
445	9972	Designating the International Joint Commission—United States and Canada as a Public International Organization Entitled To Enjoy Certain Privileges, Exemptions, and Immunities	1948-06-25
446	9973	Amendment of Executive Order 9830 of February 24, 1947, Amending the Civil Service Rules and Providing for Federal Personnel Administration	1948-06-28
447	9973-A	Exemption of Frank H. Wang From Compulsory Retirement for Age	1948-07-02
448	9974	Extension of Executive Order No. 9898 of October 14, 1947, as Amended, Suspending the Eight-Hour Law as to Laborers and Mechanics Employed by the Departments of the Army and the Air Force on Certain Public Works	1948-07-01
449	9975	Regulations Governing the Allowance of Travel Expenses of Claimants and Beneficiaries of the Veterans' Administration and Their Attendants	1948-07-07
450	9976	Amendment of Executive Order No. 9871 of July 8, 1947, Prescribing Regulations Governing the Granting of Allowances for Quarters and Subsistence To Enlisted Men of the Army, Navy, Marine Corps, and Coast Guard, and Per Diem Allowances to Members of Such Services and Coast and Geodetic Survey and Public Health Service on Duty Outside the Continental United States or in Alaska	1948-07-12
451	9977	Discontinuing Certain District Land Offices	1948-07-14
452	9978	Transfer of the District Land Offices at Blackfoot and Coeur d'Alene, Idaho, to Boise, Idaho	1948-07-17
453	9979	Prescribing Portions of the Selective Service Regulations and Authorizing the Director of Selective Service To Perform Certain Functions of the President Under the Selective Service Act of 1948	1948-07-20
454	9980	Regulations Governing Fair Employment Practices Within the Federal Establishment	July 26, 1948
455	9981	Establishing the President's Committee on Equality of Treatment and Opportunity in the Armed Services; Prohibited Racial, Religious, and Ethnic Discrimination in the Armed Forces	July 26, 1948
456	9982	Extending the Provisions of Executive Order No. 9870 of July 8, 1947, Prescribing Regulations Pertaining to the Granting of and Accounting for Certain Foreign Service Allowances and Allotments	1948-07-29
457	9983	Exemption of Garland S. Ferguson From Compulsory Retirement for Age	1948-07-31
458	9984	Regulations Governing the Furnishing of Clothing in Kind or Payment of Cash Allowances in Lieu Thereof to Enlisted Personnel of the Navy, Coast Guard, Naval Reserve, and Coast Guard Reserve	1948-07-31
459	9985	Appointment of Mrs. Margaret E. Batick to a Competitive Position Without Compliance With the Requirements of the Civil Service Rules	1948-08-16
460	9986	Sale of Vessels of the Navy	1948-08-16
461	9987	Creating a Board of Inquiry To Report on Certain Labor Disputes Affecting the Maritime Industry of the United States	1948-08-17
462	9988	Prescribing Portions of the Selective Service Regulations	1948-08-20
463	9989	Transferring Jurisdiction Over Blocked Assets to the Attorney General	1948-08-20
464	9990	Enlarging the Membership of the Air Coordinating Committee To Include a Representative of the Treasury Department	1948-08-21
465	9991	Creating an Emergency Board To Investigate a Dispute Between the Pittsburgh & West Virginia Railway Company and Certain of Its Employees	1948-08-26
466	9992	Amending the Selective Service Regulations	1948-08-28
467	9993	Regulations Relating to Commissioned Officers and Employees of the Public Health Service	1948-08-31
468	9994	Amendment of Executive Order No. 9952 of April 22, 1948, Providing for the Termination of Reemployment Rights of Federal Civil Employees Who Transferred to Public or Private Agencies for National-Defense or War Work	1948-09-01
469	9995	Restoring Certain Lands of the Schofield Barracks Military Reservation and the Wheeler Field Military Reservation to the Jurisdiction of the Territory of Hawaii	1948-09-02
470	9996	Creating an Emergency Board To Investigate a Dispute Between the Public Belt Railroad Commission for the City of New Orleans and Certain of Its Employees	1948-09-08
471	9997	Amendment of Executive Order No. 9805, Prescribing Regulations Governing Payment of Travel and Transportation Expenses	1948-09-08
472	9998	Rules of Precedence Relating to Officers of the Foreign Service and Other Officers of the United States Government	1948-09-14
473	9999	Suspending Certain Statutory Provisions Relating to Employment in the Canal Zone	1948-09-14
474	10000	Regulations Governing Additional Compensation and Credit Granted Certain Employees of the Federal Government Serving Outside the United States	1948-09-16
475	10001	Prescribing or Amending Portions of the Selective Service Regulations and Directing the Selection of Persons for Induction Into the Armed Forces and Their Induction	1948-09-17
476	10002	Exemption of Lawrence M. Lawson From Compulsory Retirement for Age	1948-09-17
477	10003	Providing for the Investigation of and Report on Displaced Persons Seeking Admission into the United States	1948-10-04
478	10004	Prescribing Procedures for the Administration of the Reciprocal Trade Agreements Program	1948-10-05
479	10005	Establishing the President's Advisory Commission on the Relation of Federal Laws to Puerto Rico	1948-10-05
480	10006	Preparation, Presentation, Filing, and Publication of Executive Orders and Proclamations	1948-10-09
481	10007	Organization of the Reserve Units of the Armed Forces	1948-10-15
482	10008	Amending the Selective Service Regulations	1948-10-18
483	10009	Revoking in Part Executive Orders No. 589 of March 14, 1907, and No. 1712 of February 24, 1913	1948-10-18
484	10010	Creating an Emergency Board To Investigate Disputes Between the Akron & Barberton Belt Railroad Company and Other Carriers, and Certain of Their Employees	1948-10-18
485	10011	Authorizing the Secretary of State To Exercise Certain Powers of the President With Respect to the Granting of Allowances and Allotments to Government Personnel on Foreign Duty	1948-10-22
486	10012	Excluding From the Provisions of the Classification Act of 1923, as Amended, Positions Filled by Patients in Government Hospitals	1948-10-22
487	10013	Establishing the President's Committee on Religious and Moral Welfare and Character Guidance in the Armed Forces	1948-10-27
488	10014	Directing Federal Agencies To Cooperate With State and Local Authorities in Preventing Pollution of Surface and Underground Waters	1948-11-03
489	10015	Amendment of Executive Order No. 10010, Creating an Emergency Board To Investigate Disputes Between the Akron & Barberton Belt Railroad Company and Other Carriers, and Certain of Their Employees	1948-11-05
490	10016	Coat of Arms, Seal, and Flag of the Vice President of the United States	1948-11-10
491	10017	Amendment of the Regulations Governing the Appointment of Postmasters of the Fourth Class	1948-11-10
492	10018	Transferring the Control and Jurisdiction Over Certain Tracts of Land in Puerto Rico From the Secretary of the Interior to the Secretary of Agriculture for Forest Purposes	1948-11-15
493	10019	Excusing Federal Employees From Duty One-Half Day on December 24, 1948	1948-12-02
494	10020	Prescribing the Manual for Courts-Martial, U.S. Army, 1949	1948-12-07
495	10021	Further Exemption of Harry B. Mitchell From Compulsory Retirement for Age	1948-12-14
496	10022	Transferring the Use, Possession, and Control of Certain Lands From the Department of the Army to the Tennessee Valley Authority	1948-12-14
497	10023	Amendment of Executive Order 9984 of July 31, 1948, Prescribing Regulations Governing the Furnishing of Clothing in Kind or Payment of Cash Allowances in Lieu Thereof to Enlisted Personnel of the Navy, Coast Guard, Naval Reserve, and Coast Guard Reserve	1948-12-20
498	10024	Restoration of Lands to Location and Entry Under the Mining Laws of the United States	1948-12-30
499	10025	Designating Public International Organizations Entitled To Enjoy Certain Privileges, Exemptions, and Immunities	1948-12-30

=== 1949 ===
Relative No.	Absolute No.	Title / Description	Date signed
500	10026	Adopting the Manual for Courts-Martial, U.S. Army, 1949, for Use in the Department of the Air Force	1949-01-04
501	10064	Korea	1949-01-05
502	10065	Extension of Trust Periods on Indian Lands Expiring During the Calendar Year 1949	1949-01-06
503	10066	Defining Noncombatant Service and Noncombatant Training	1949-01-13
504	10067	Creating an Emergency Board To Investigate a Dispute Between the Northwest Airlines, Inc., and Certain of its Employees	1949-01-19
505	10068	Revoking Executive Order No. 2458 of September 20, 1916, Establishing an Inter-Departmental Board on International Service of Ice Observation, Ice Patrol, and Ocean Derelict Destruction	1949-01-26
506	10069	Separation of Officers of the Public Health Service on Grounds of Disloyalty	1949-01-26
507	10070	Creating an Emergency Board To Investigate a Dispute Between the Akron, Canton and Youngstown Railroad Company and Other Carriers, and Certain of Their Employees	1949-01-28
508	10071	Regulations Governing the Providing of Statistical Information to Intergovernmental Organizations	1949-02-08
509	10072	Further Exemption of John Monroe Johnson From Compulsory Retirement for Age	1949-02-09
510	10073	Designating the Honorable Luis Negron-Fernandez as Acting Judge of the District Court of the United States for Puerto Rico for the Year 1949	1949-02-10
511	10074	Restoration of Lands to Location and Entry Under the Mining Laws of the United States	1949-02-10
512	10075	Creating an Emergency Board To Investigate a Dispute Between the Denver & Rio Grande Western Railroad Company and Certain of Its Employees	1949-02-14
513	10076	Creating an Emergency Board To Investigate Dispute Between the Carriers Represented by the Eastern Carriers' Conference Committee and Southeastern Carriers' Conference Committee, and Certain of Their Employees	1949-02-15
514	10077	Authorizing the Civil Service Commission To Confer a Competitive Status Upon Miss Winifred R. Donnellon	1949-02-21
515	10078	Amendment of 9999, Suspending Certain Statutory Provisions Relating to Employment in the Canal Zone	1949-02-21
516	10079	Restoring Certain Lands of the United States Naval Reservation of Hanapepe, Kona, Kauai, to the Jurisdiction of the Territory of Hawaii	1949-03-10
517	10080	Making Certain Changes in the Customs Field Organizations	1949-03-10
518	10081	Changing the Name of the President's Committee on Religious and Moral Welfare and Character Guidance in the Armed Forces	1949-03-10
519	10082	Amendment of 9 of January 17, 1873, Relating to the Holding of State or Local Offices by Federal Officers and Employees	1949-03-15
520	10083	Creating an Emergency Board To Investigate a Dispute Between the Wabash Railroad Company and the Ann Arbor Railroad Company and Certain of Their Employees	1949-03-15
521	10084	Transferring Certain Lands From the Department of Agriculture to the Department of the Interior and Withdrawing of Public Lands for the Use of the Department of Agriculture	1949-03-24
522	10085	Restoring a Portion of Honolulu Harbor to the Jurisdiction of the Territory of Hawaii	1949-03-26
523	10086	Creating an Emergency Board To Investigate a Dispute Between the Southern Pacific Company (Pacific Lines) and Certain of its Employees	1949-03-30
524	10087	Delegating the Authority of the President To Prescribe Clothing Allowances, and Cash Allowances in Lieu Thereof, to Enlisted Men in the Armed Forces	1949-04-02
525	10088	Creating an Emergency Board To Investigate a Dispute Between the Railway Express Agency, Inc., and Certain of its Employees	1949-04-09
526	10089	Creating an Emergency Board To Investigate a Dispute Between the Aliquippa and Southern Railroad Company and Certain of its Employees	1949-04-15
527	10090	Enlarging Naval Petroleum Reserve No. 1; Revoking in Part Public Land Order No. 460 of April 1, 1948	1949-04-20
528	10091	Regulations Governing the Transportation of Household Goods of Members of the Air Force, Army, Navy, Marine Corps, Coast Guard, Coast and Geodetic Survey, and Public Health Service	1949-04-20
529	10092	Modifying 9721, Providing for the Transfer of Personnel to Certain Public International Organizations	1949-04-29
530	10093	Amendment of 9 of January 17, 1873, Relating to the Holding of Local Offices by Federal Officers and Employees	1949-05-06
531	10094	Creating an Emergency Board To Investigate a Dispute Between the Union Railroad Company (Pittsburgh) and Certain of its Employees	1949-05-12
532	10200	Transferring to the American Battle Monuments Commission Functions Pertaining to Certain United States Military Cemeteries	1949-05-14
533	10201	Restoring Certain Lands at Keaukaha, Waiakea, South Hilo, Hawaii, to the Jurisdiction of the Territory of Hawaii	1949-05-24
534	10202	Amendment of 9195 of July 7, 1942, as Amended, Prescribing Regulations Relating to Aerial Flights by Personnel of the Army, Navy, Marine Corps, Coast Guard, and National Guard, and Officers of the Public Health Service Detailed for Duty With the Coast Guard	1949-05-27
535	10203	Restoring Certain Land Comprising the Keaahala Military Reservation to the Jurisdiction of the Territory of Hawaii	1949-06-02
536	10204	Amendment of 9871, as Amended, Prescribing Regulations Governing the Granting of Allowances for Quarters and Subsistence to Enlisted Men of the Army, Air Force, Navy, Marine Corps, and Coast Guard, and Per Diem Allowances to Members of Such Services and Coast and Geodetic Survey and Public Health Service on Duty Outside the Continental United States or in Alaska	1949-06-02
537	10205	Establishing the Position of United States High Commissioner for Germany	1949-06-06
538	10206	Defining Certain Functions of the United States High Commissioner for Germany	1949-06-13
539	10207	Further Extension of 9898 of October 14, 1947, as Amended, Suspending the Eight-Hour Law as to Laborers and Mechanics Employed by the Departments of the Army and the Air Force on Certain Public Works	1949-06-30
540	10208	Termination of the Office of Defense Transportation	1949-07-06
541	10209	Including Certain Lands in the Cherokee National Forest	1949-07-06
542	10210	Creating an Emergency Board To Investigate a Dispute Between the Missouri Pacific Railroad Company and Certain of its Employees	1949-07-08
543	10211	Revoking 2458 of September 20, 1916, Establishing an Inter-Departmental Board on International Service of Ice Observation, Ice Patrol, and Ocean Derelict Destruction	1949-07-13
544	10212	Amendment of 9805, Prescribing Regulations Governing Payment of Certain Travel and Transportation Expenses	1949-07-14
545	10213	Amending 9975 of July 7, 1948, Prescribing Regulations Governing the Allowance of Travel Expenses of Claimants and Beneficiaries of the Veterans' Administration and Their Attendants	1949-07-20
546	10214	Creating an Emergency Board To Investigate a Dispute Between the Southern Pacific Company (Pacific Lines) and Certain of its Employees	1949-07-20
547	10215	To Provide for Continuing Action To Improve the Management of the Executive Branch of the Government	1949-07-29
548	10216	Exemption of Eugene Black from Compulsory Retirement for Age	1949-07-29
549	10217	Transfer of the District Land Office at Carson City, Nevada, to Reno, Nevada	1949-08-09
550	10218	Eliminating Certain Public Lands From Naval Petroleum Reserve No. 2 and Reserving Them for Townsite Purposes	1949-08-18
551	10219	Inspection of Income, Excess-Profits, and Declared Value Excess-Profits Tax Returns by the Military Renegotiation Policy and Review Board	1949-09-01
552	10220	Transfer of the Administration of the Island of Guam from the Secretary of the Navy to the Secretary of the Interior	1949-09-07
553	10221	Creating an Emergency Board To Investigate a Dispute Between the Monongahela Connecting Railroad Company and Certain of its Employees	1949-09-09
554	10222	Transferring Certain Property in the Virgin Islands to the Permanent Control and Jurisdiction of the Secretary of the Interior	1949-09-09
555	10223	Enabling Certain Employees of the Federal Government To Acquire Civil Service Status	1949-09-30
556	10224	Designation of Certain Officers To Act as Postmaster General	1949-10-01
557	10225	Prescribing Procedures for the Administration of Reciprocal Trade-Agreements Program	1949-10-05
558	10226	Revocation of Executive Orders Nos. 9698, 9751, and 9823 so Far as They Pertain to Certain International Organizations	1949-10-10
559	10227	Prescribing Regulations for the Administration of Certain Provisions of the Career Compensation Act of 1949	1949-10-12
560	10228	Amendment of 10011 Authorizing the Secretary of State To Exercise Certain Powers of the President With Respect to the Granting of Allowances and Allotments to Government Personnel on Foreign Duty	1949-10-28
561	10229	Designating the South Pacific Commission as a Public International Organization Entitled To Enjoy Certain Privileges, Exemptions, and Immunities	1949-11-25
562	10230	Amendment of 10057 of May 14, 1949, Transferring to the American Battle Monuments Commission Functions Pertaining to Certain United States Military Cemeteries	1949-12-03
563	10231	Making Certain Changes in the Customs Field Organization	1949-12-03
564	10232	Suspending Certain Statutory Provisions Relating to Employment in the Canal Zone	1949-12-06
565	10233	Inspection of Income Tax Returns by Federal Trade Commission	1949-12-06
566	10234	Extension of Trust Periods on Indian Lands Expiring During the Calendar Year 1950	1949-12-11
567	10235	Establishing an Airspace Reservation Over Certain Areas of the Superior National Forest in Minnesota	1949-12-17
568	10236	Revocation of 9512 of January 16, 1945, Providing for Coordination of the Allocations of Field Positions Subject to the Classification Act of 1923, as Amended	1949-12-20
569	10094	Further Exemption of Clyde B. Aitchison From Compulsory Retirement for Age	1949-12-22

=== 1950 ===
Relative No.	Absolute No.	Title / Description	Date signed

=== 1951 ===
Relative No.	Absolute No.	Title / Description	Date signed
	10200	Establishing the Defense Production Administration	1951-01-03
	10239	Attaching the Virgin Islands to the Internal Revenue Collection District of Maryland	1951-01-11
	10240	Prescribing or Amending Portions of the Selective Service Regulations	1951-01-12
	10241	Creating an Emergency Board To Investigate a Dispute Between the American Airlines, Inc., and Certain of Its Employees	1951-01-13
	10242	Prescribing Regulations Governing the Payment of Basic Allowances for Quarters	1951-01-15
	10243	Amending 10182 Relating to the Appointment of Certain Persons Under the Defense Production Act of 1950	1951-01-16
	10244	Providing for Support of United Nations' Activities Directed to the Peaceful Settlement of Disputes	1951-01-19
	10245	Establishing the President's Commission on Internal Security and Individual Rights	1951-01-23
	10246	Providing for the Administration of the Yugoslav Emergency Relief Assistance Act of 1950	1951-01-25
	10247	Amending 8557 of September 30, 1940, Entitled "Prescribing Regulations Governing the Payment of Expenses Incurred in Connection With the Death of Certain Civilian Officers and Employees of the United States "	1951-02-01
	10248	Authorizing the Department of Defense and the Department of Commerce To Exercise the Functions and Powers Set Forth in Title II of the First War Powers Act, 1941, as Amended by the Act of January 12, 1951, and Prescribing Regulations for the Exercise of Such Functions and Powers	1951-02-02
	10249	Placing in Operation the Provisions of Section 31 of the Organic Act of Guam	1951-02-06
	10250	Transferring the Use, Possession, and Control of Lands and Rights-of-Way in the Cherokee National Forest From the Department of Agriculture to the Tennessee Valley Authority	1951-02-06
	10251	Including Certain Lands in the Nantahala and Cherokee National Forests	1951-02-06
	10252	Prescribing the Manual for Courts-Martial, United States, 1951	1951-02-08
	10253	Exemption of Arthur A. Quinn From Compulsory Retirement for Age	1951-02-16
	10254	Extension of the Provisions of Part I of 10210 of February 2, 1951, to the Department of Agriculture, the Atomic Energy Commission, the National Advisory Committee for Aeronautics, and the Government Printing Office	1951-02-23
	10255	Amending Paragraph 1(c) of 10157 of August 28, 1950, Enabling Certain Employees of the Federal Government To Acquire a Competitive Status	1951-02-26
	10256	Establishing an Airspace Reservation Over the Las Vegas Project, Las Vegas, Nevada	1951-02-28
	10257	Defining Certain Responsibilities of Federal Agencies With Respect to Transportation and Storage	1951-02-28
	10258	Authorizing the Appointment of Stanley C. Wollaston to a Competitive Position Without Regard to the Civil Service Rules	1951-03-02
	10259	Providing for the Administration of Disaster Relief	1951-03-02
	10260	Providing for Certain Transfers to the Federal Civil Defense Administration	1951-03-08
	10261	Further Providing for the Performance of Certain Functions Under the Defense Production Act of 1950	1951-03-10
	10262	Establishing the National Advisory Board on Mobilization Policy	1951-03-15
	10263	Exemption of Bernice Pyke From Compulsory Retirement for Age	1951-03-17
	10264	Regulations Relating to the Safeguarding of Vessels, Harbors, Ports, and Waterfront Facilities in the Canal Zone	1951-03-23
	10265	Extension of the Provisions of Part I of 10210 of February 2, 1951, to the General Services Administration	1951-03-24
	10266	Designating the Inter-American Defense Board as a Public International Organization Entitled To Enjoy Certain Privileges, Exemptions, and Immunities	1951-03-26
	10267	Exemption of Hugh H. Bennett From Compulsory Retirement for Age	1951-03-30
	10268	Amending the Selective Service Regulations	1951-03-31
	10269	Extension of the Provisions of Part I of 10210 of February 2, 1951, to the Tennessee Valley Authority	1951-04-05
	10270	Amending the Selective Service Regulations	1951-04-18
	10271	Amending Executive Order 10161 With Respect to Wage Stabilization and Settlement of Labor Disputes	1951-04-21
	10272	Transferring Certain Lands From the Department of Agriculture to the Department of the Interior and Withdrawing Certain Public Lands for the Use of the Department of Agriculture	1951-04-23
	10273	Establishing a Seal for the Economic Stabilization Agency	1951-04-25
	10274	Establishing the President's Commission on Migratory Labor	1951-04-26
	10275	Making the Provisions of the Act of August 26, 1950, Public Law 733, 81st Congress, Applicable to the Panama Canal and Panama Railroad Company	1951-04-26
	10276	Making Certain Changes in the Customs Field Organization	1951-04-27
	10277	Exemption of Howell Cone From Compulsory Retirement for Age	1951-04-27
	10278	Regulations Governing the Separation From the Service of Certain Women Serving in the Regular Army, Navy, Marine Corps, or Air Force	1951-04-27
	10279	Amending 9835 Entitled "Prescribing Procedures for the Administration of an Employees Loyalty Program in the Executive Branch of the Government"	1951-04-28
	10280	Prescribing Regulations Governing the Exercise by the Federal Civil Defense Administrator of Certain Administrative Authority Granted by the Federal Civil Defense Act of 1950	1951-05-08
	10281	Extension of the Provisions of Part I of 10210 of February 2, 1951, to the Federal Civil Defense Administration	1951-05-11
	10282	Designating the Secretary of State and the Attorney General as the Officers To Perform Certain Functions With Respect to the Settlement of Intercustodial Conflicts Relating to Enemy Property	1951-05-17
	10283	Establishing a Commission for the Commemoration of the One Hundred and Seventy-Fifth Anniversary of the Signing of the Declaration of Independence	1951-05-17
	10284	Transferring the Use, Possession, and Control of Certain Land From the Department of the Interior to the Tennessee Valley Authority	1951-05-18
	10285	Suspending the Limitations Upon Punishments for Violations of Articles 82, 85, 86(3), 87, 90, 91(1) and (2), 113, and 115 of the Uniform Code of Military Justice	1951-05-29
	10286	Transfer of Certain Lands From the Sacramento, California, Land District to the Los Angeles, California, Land District	1951-06-02
	10287	Prescribing Regulations With Respect to Foreign Service Reporting Functions	1951-06-04
	10288	Providing for the Performance of Certain Functions of the President by the Secretary of the Interior	1951-06-05
	10289	Suspension of the Eight-Hour Law as to Laborers and Mechanics Employed by the Department of Defense on Public Work Essential to the National Defense	1951-06-07
	10290	Attaching the Canal Zone to the Internal Revenue Collection District of Florida	1951-06-09
	10291	Providing for the Improvement of the Work of Federal Executive Agencies With Respect to Statistical Information	1951-06-11
	10292	Terminating the Philippine Alien Property Administration and Transferring its Functions to the Department of Justice	1951-06-15
	10293	Further Exemption of Claude L. Draper From Compulsory Retirement for Age	1951-06-22
	10294	Amendment of Paragraph 126e of the Manual for Courts-Martial, United States, 1951	1951-06-23
	10295	Amendment of 7397, as Amended, Establishing the Federal Fire Council	1951-06-23
	10296	Amending the Selective Service Regulations	1951-06-26
	10297	Delegating to the Secretary of State the Authority Vested in the President by Title V of the Foreign Economic Assistance Act of 1950 Relating to International Children's Welfare Work	1951-06-27
	10298	Designating Certain Agencies Pursuant to Section 103(a) of the Renegotiation Act of 1951	1951-06-27
	10299	Amendment of 10000 of September 16, 1948, Prescribing Regulations Governing Additional Compensation and Credit Granted Certain Employees of the Federal Government Serving Outside the United States	1951-06-27
	10300	Suspension of Professional Examinations for Promotion of Medical, Dental, and Veterinary Officers in the Regular Army and Air Force	1951-06-28
	10301	Transfer of the Panama Canal (the Waterway), Together With Facilities and Appurtenances Related Thereto, and Other Facilities and Appurtenances Maintained and Operated by the Panama Canal (the Agency), to the Panama Railroad Company	1951-06-29
	10302	Transfer of the Administration of American Samoa From the Secretary of the Navy to the Secretary of the Interior	1951-06-29
	10303	Transfer of the Administration of the Trust Territory of the Pacific Islands From the Secretary of the Navy to the Secretary of the Interior	1951-06-29
	10304	Suspension of Certain Provisions of the Officer Personnel Act of 1947, as Amended, Which Relate to Officers of the Navy and Marine Corps	1951-06-30
	10305	Including Certain Lands in Nantahala National Forest	1951-07-03
	10306	Restoring Certain Lands Comprising Portions of the Fort Ruger Military Reservation to the Jurisdiction of the Territory of Hawaii	1951-07-05
	10307	Delegating to the Director of Defense Mobilization the Authority of the President To Determine, With Respect to the Need for School Facilities, Areas Which are Critical by Reason of National-Defense Activities	1951-07-06
	10308	Extension of Enlistments in the Armed Forces of the United States	1951-07-06
	10309	Delegating Authority of the President To Order Members and Units of Reserve Components of Armed Forces Into Active Federal Duty	1951-07-07
	10310	Delegating to the Secretary of the Army the Authority of the President To Prescribe Rules, Regulations, and Restrictions With Respect to the Army and Navy Hospital at Hot Springs, Arkansas	1951-07-10
	10311	Exemption of Herbert E. Gaston From Compulsory Retirement for Age	1951-07-18
	10312	Further Amendment of 9805, Prescribing Regulations Governing Payment of Certain Travel and Transportation Expenses	1951-07-18
	10313	Inspection of Income, Excess-Profits, Declared Value Excess-Profits, Capital Stock, Estate, and Gift Tax Returns by the Senate Committee on Expenditures in the Executive Departments	1951-07-25
	10314	Administration of the Housing and Rent Act of 1947, as Amended, and Termination of the Office of the Housing Expediter	1961-07-31
	10315	Amending Regulations Relating to the Safeguarding of Vessels, Harbors, Ports, and Waterfront Facilities of the United States	1951-08-01
	10316	Withdrawing From Appropriation the Phosphate Reserved to the United States in Certain Patented Lands and Transferring the Use, Possession, and Control Thereof to the Tennessee Valley Authority	1951-08-09
	10317	Inspection of Income, Excess-Profits, Declared Value Excess-Profits, Capital Stock, Estates, and Gift Tax Returns for Any Period to and Including 1950 by the Senate Special Committee To Investigate Crime in Interstate Commerce	1951-08-16
	10318	Separation of Officers of the Public Health Service on Grounds of Disloyalty	1951-08-16
	10319	Defense Materials Procurement and Supply	1951-08-28
	10320	Suspension of the Eight-Hour Law as to Laborers and Mechanics Employed by the Department of the Interior on Public Work Essential to the National Defense	1951-08-29
	10321	Creating a Board of Inquiry To Report on Certain Labor Disputes Affecting the Copper and Non-Ferrous Metals Industry	1951-08-30
	10322	Extension of Time Relating to the Disposition of Certain Housing	1951-09-01
	10323	Creating an Emergency Board To Investigate a Dispute Between Denver & Rio Grande Railroad Company, Including the Denver & Salt Lake Railroad Company, Operated by the Secretary of the Army, and Certain Workers	1951-09-06
	10324	Creating an Emergency Board To Investigate a Dispute Between the Pullman Company and Certain of its Employees	1951-09-06
	10325	Revoking 8034 of January 14, 1939, and Abolishing the Federal Real Estate Board	1951-09-06
	10326	Further Amending 10157 of August 28, 1950, Enabling Certain Employees of the Federal Government To Acquire a Competitive Status	1951-09-07
	10327	Providing for the Performance of Certain Functions of the President by the Secretary of the Treasury	1951-09-17
	10328	Prescribing Regulations Establishing Minimum Standards for the Classification, Transmission, and Handling, by Department and Agencies of the Executive Branch, of Official Information Which Requires Safeguarding in the Interest of the Security of the United States	1951-09-24
	10329	Establishing an Airspace Reservation Over the Savannah River Plant of the United States Atomic Energy Commission	1951-09-25
	10330	Amending the Selective Service Regulations	1951-09-25
	10331	Amending 10276 With Respect to the Administration of Title I of the Housing and Rent Act of 1947, as Amended	1951-09-27
	10332	Designating Additional Agencies Pursuant to Section 103(a) of the Renegotiation Act of 1951	1951-09-28
	10333	Establishing a Seal for the United States Court of Military Appeals	1951-09-28
	10334	Providing for the Performance of Certain Defense Housing and Community Facilities and Services Functions	1951-10-02
	10335	Providing for a Telecommunications Advisor to the President	1951-10-09
	10336	Extending the Provisions of Part I of 10210 of February 2, 1951, to the Department of the Interior	1951-10-31
	10337	Designating an Additional Agency Pursuant to Section 103(a) of the Renegotiation Act of 1951	1951-10-31
	10338	Providing for the Administration of the Mutual Security Act of 1951 and Related Statutes	1951-11-01
	10339	Amending 10161, as Amended, To Provide for Alternate Members of the Wage Stabilization Board	1951-11-02
	10340	Interdepartmental Committee on Narcotics	1951-11-02
	10341	Creating an Emergency Board To Investigate a Dispute Between Certain Transportation Systems Operated by the Secretary of the Army and Certain of Their Employees	1951-11-06
	10342	Inspection of Income, Excess-Profits, Declared Value Excess-Profits, Capital Stock, Estate, and Gift Tax Returns by the Senate Committee on the District of Columbia	1951-11-12
	10343	Revoking 10207 of January 23, 1951, Establishing the President's Commission on Internal Security and Individual Rights	1951-11-14
	10344	Creating an Emergency Board To Investigate Disputes Between the Akron & Barberton Belt Railroad Co. and Other Carriers and Certain Workers	1951-11-15
	10345	Delegating to the Secretary of State the Authority of the President To Prescribe Regulations Governing the Taking of Testimony With Respect to the Authentication of Foreign Documents and the Fixing of Certain Fees in Connection Therewith	1951-11-23
	10346	Improving the Means for Obtaining Compliance With the Nondiscrimination Provisions of Federal Contracts	1951-12-03
	10347	Restoring Possession, Use, and Control of Certain Lands Reserved for Military Purposes to the Territory of Hawaii and Transferring Title to Such Lands to the Territory	1951-12-03
	10348	Designating the Honorable A. Cecil Snyder To Act, Under Certain Circumstances, as Judge of the District Court of the United States for Puerto Rico During the Year 1952	1951-12-10
	10349	Suspending Certain Statutory Provisions Relating to Employment in the Canal Zone	1951-12-10
	10350	Providing for Emergency Control Over Certain Government and Non-Government Stations Engaged in Radio Communication or Radio Transmission of Energy	1951-12-10
	10351	Amendment of 10011 of October 22, 1948, as Amended, Authorizing the Secretary of State To Exercise Certain Powers of the President With Respect to the Granting of Allowances and Allotments to Government Personnel on Foreign Duty	1951-12-14
	10352	Creating an Emergency Board To Investigate a Dispute Between Pan American Airways, Inc., and Certain of Its Employees	1951-12-17
	10353	Exemption of William E. Lee From Compulsory Retirement for Age	1951-12-19
	10354	Inspection of Income, Excess-Profits, Declared Value Excess-Profits, Capital Stock, Estate, and Gift Tax Returns by the Senate Committee on Armed Services	1951-12-29
	10317	Establishing the President's Commission on the Health Needs of the Nation	1951-12-29

=== 1952 ===
Relative No.	Absolute No.	Title / Description	Date signed
	10318	Establishing the Missouri Basin Survey Commission	1952-01-03
	10357	Creating an Emergency Board To Investigate a Dispute Between the Northwest Airlines, Inc., and Certain of Its Employees	1952-01-04
	10358	Further Exemption of Lawrence M. Lawson From Compulsory Retirement For Age	1952-01-21
	10359	Inspection of Income, Excess-Profits, Declared Value Excess-Profits, Capital Stock, Estate, and Gift Tax Returns by the Senate Committee on Rules and Administration	1952-01-24
	10360	Amendment of Section 1 of 10046 of March 24, 1949, as Amended, Transferring Certain Lands From the Department of Agriculture to the Department of the Interior	1952-01-26
	10361	Transferring Certain Functions and Delegating Certain Powers to the Small Defense Plants Administration	1952-02-05
	10362	Amending 10161 of September 9, 1950, With Respect To the Definitions of Solid Fuels and Domestic Transportation, Storage, and Port Facilities	1952-02-06
	10363	Regulations Governing the Award of the Medal for Humane Actions	1952-02-07
	10364	Inspection of Income, Excess-Profits, Declared Value Excess-Profits, Capital Stock, Estate, and Gift Tax Returns by the Senate Committee on Expenditure in the Executive Departments	1952-02-11
	10365	Investigations Relating to the Conduct of Government Business	1952-02-20
	10366	Prescribing a Portion of the Selective Service Regulations	1952-02-20
	10367	Amending 10318 of January 3, 1952, Relating to the Missouri Basin Survey Commission	1952-02-25
	10368	Exemption of Frances Perkins From Compulsory Retirement for Age	1952-02-01
	10369	Inspection of Income Tax Returns by the Senate Committee on Interior and Insular Affairs	1952-03-04
	10370	Prescribing the Order of Succession of Officers To Act as Secretary of Defense, Secretary of the Army, Secretary of the Navy, and Secretary of the Air Force	1952-03-07
	10371	Further Exemption of Bernice Pyke From Compulsory Retirement for Age	1952-03-25
	10372	Exemption of Frederick C. Mayer From Compulsory Retirement for Age	1952-03-26
	10373	Designating the Provisional Intergovernmental Committee for the Movement of Migrants From Europe as a Public International Organization Entitled To Enjoy Certain Privileges, Exemptions, and Immunities	1952-03-28
	10374	Amendment of 9586 of July 6, 1945, Establishing the Medal of Freedom	1952-04-03
	10375	Amendment of the Regulations Governing the Appointment of Postmasters of the Fourth Class	1952-04-03
	10376	Coordination Procedures Under Section 507 of the Mutual Security Act of 1951	1952-04-04
	10377	Extensions of Time Relating to the Disposition of Certain Housing	1952-04-05
	10378	Directing the Secretary of Commerce To Take Possession of and Operate the Plants and Facilities of Certain Steel Companies	1952-04-08
	10379	Discontinuing the Rose Island and the Tutuila Island Naval Defensive Sea Areas and Naval Airspace Reservations	1952-04-08
	10380	Restoring Lands of the Sugar Loaf Military Reservation and Right-of-Way Thereto to the Jurisdiction of the Territory of Hawaii	1952-04-12
	10381	Inspection of Tax Returns by Committee on the Judiciary, House of Representatives	1952-04-12
	10382	Prescribing or Amending Portions of the Selective Service Regulations	1952-04-17
	10383	Extension of Enlistments in the Armed Forces of the United States	1952-04-17
	10384	Preparation by Federal Agencies of Civil Defense Emergency Plans	1952-04-17
	10385	Providing for the Affixing of the Seal of the United States to Certain Presidential Documents	1952-04-18
	10386	Continuing in Force Orders and Regulations Relating to Blocked Property	1952-04-26
	10387	Declaring the Commissioned Corps of the Public Health Service To Be a Military Service and Prescribing Regulations Therefore,	1952-04-26
	10388	Establishing a Seal for the Federal Civil Defense Administration	1952-05-14
	10389	Designation of Certain Persons for the Purpose of Issuing Provisional Certificates of Registry to Certain Vessels Abroad	1952-05-15
	10390	Amendment of the Regulations Relating to the Safeguarding of Vessels, Harbors, Ports, and Waterfront Facilities of the United States	1952-05-19
	10391	Authorizing the Appointment of Cressie E. Coffelt to a Competitive Position Without Regard to the Civil Service Rules	1952-05-21
	10392	Amendment of the Regulations Relating to Commissioned Officers and Employees of the Public Health Service	1952-05-26
	10393	Delegating to the Secretary of the Interior the Authority of the President To Withdraw or Reserve Lands of the United States for Public Purposes	1952-05-26
	10394	Continuing the Commissioned Corps of the Public Health Service as a Military Service	1952-05-29
	10395	Including Certain Lands in Nantahala National Forest	1952-06-04
	10396	Observance of Holidays by Government Agencies	1952-06-09
	10397	Amending 10161, as Amended, With Respect to Plant Fibers	1952-06-09
	10398	Amendment of 9781, Establishing the Air Coordinating Committee	1952-06-11
	10399	Establishing the Whittier Defensive Sea Area, Alaska	1952-06-11
	10400	Continuing the Commissioned Corps of the Public Health Service as a Military Service	1952-06-14
	10401	Amending the Selective Service Regulations	1952-06-17
	10402	Exemption of John J. Deviny From Compulsory Retirement For Age	1952-06-17
	10403	Suspension of Certain Provisions of the Officer Personnel Act of 1947, as Amended, Which Relate to Officers of the Marine Corps	1952-06-24
	10404	Amending the Selective Service Regulations	1952-06-26
	10405	Continuing the Commissioned Corps of the Public Health Service as a Military Service	1952-06-30
	10406	Amendment of 10300, Entitled "Providing for the Administration of the Mutual Security Act of 1951 and Related Statues "	1952-06-30
	10407	Further Designation Pursuant to Section 103(a) of the Renegotiation Act of 1951	1952-06-30
	10408	Delegating Certain Authority of the President to the Small Defense Plants Administrator	1952-07-07
	10409	Creating an Emergency Board To Investigate a Dispute Between the Trans World Airlines, Inc., and Certain of its Employees	1952-07-09
	10410	Creating an Emergency Board To Investigate a Dispute Between the Northwest Airlines, Inc., and Certain of its Employees	1952-07-10
	10411	Amending 10161 With Respect to Real Estate Credit	1952-07-14
	10412	Enlarging the Nicolet and Chequamegon National Forests, Wisconsin	1952-07-15
	10413	Restoring Lands Comprising the Round Top Military Reservation and Rights-of-Way Thereto to the Jurisdiction of the Territory of Hawaii	1952-07-15
	10414	Providing for Permanent Appointments in the Field Service of the Post Office Department	1952-07-18
	10415	Providing for the Composition of the Wage Stabilization Board	1952-07-25
	10416	Restoring Certain Land at Hilo, Hawaii, to the Jurisdiction of Hawaii	1952-07-31
	10417	Suspension of the Operation of Certain Provisions of the Officer Personnel Act of 1947 Applicable to the Retirement of Colonels of the Regular Army and the Regular Air Force	1952-08-02
	10417-A	Defining Certain Functions of the United States High Commissioner for Germany	1952-08-02
	10418	Amendment of 9805, Prescribing Regulations Governing Payment of Certain Travel and Transportation Expenses	1952-08-06
	10419	Providing for the Liquidation of the Affairs of the Displaced Persons Commission	1952-08-09
	10420	Restoring Certain Lands at Palaau, Molokai, to the Jurisdiction of the Territory of Hawaii	1952-08-11
	10421	Restoring Certain Land Reserved in Connection With the Hilo Airport Military Reservation to the Jurisdiction of the Territory of Hawaii	1952-08-11
	10421	Extension of Time Relating to the Removal of Certain Temporary Housing	1952-08-16
	10422	Inspection of Files Covering Compromise Settlements of Tax Liability	1952-08-20
	10423	Specification of Laws From Which Certain Functions Authorized by the Mutual Security Act of 1951, as Amended, Shall be Exempt	1952-08-25
	10424	Revocation of 8616 of December 19, 1940, Placing Palmyra Island Under the Control and Jurisdiction of the Secretary of the Navy	1952-08-27
	10425	Restoring Certain Land Reserved for Military Purposes of the United States to the Jurisdiction of the Territory of Hawaii	1952-08-30
	10426	Amending 10161 of September 9, 1950, as Amended, To Provide for Certain Alternate Members of the Wage Stabilization Board	1952-08-30
	10427	Amendment of 10011 of October 22, 1948, as Amended, Authorizing the Secretary of State To Exercise Certain Powers of the President With Respect to the Granting of Allowances and Allotments to Government Personnel on Foreign Duty	1952-09-03
	10428	Establishing the President's Commission on Immigration and Naturalization	1952-09-04
	10429	Establishment of the Clemency and Parole Board for War Criminals	1952-09-04
	10430	Suspending Certain Statutory Provisions Relating to Employment in the Canal Zone	1952-09-08
	10395	Extension of Time Relating to the Disposition of Certain Temporary Housing	1952-09-18
	10421	Providing for the Physical Security of Facilities Important to the National Defense	1952-12-31
