= Solid Fuels Administration for War =

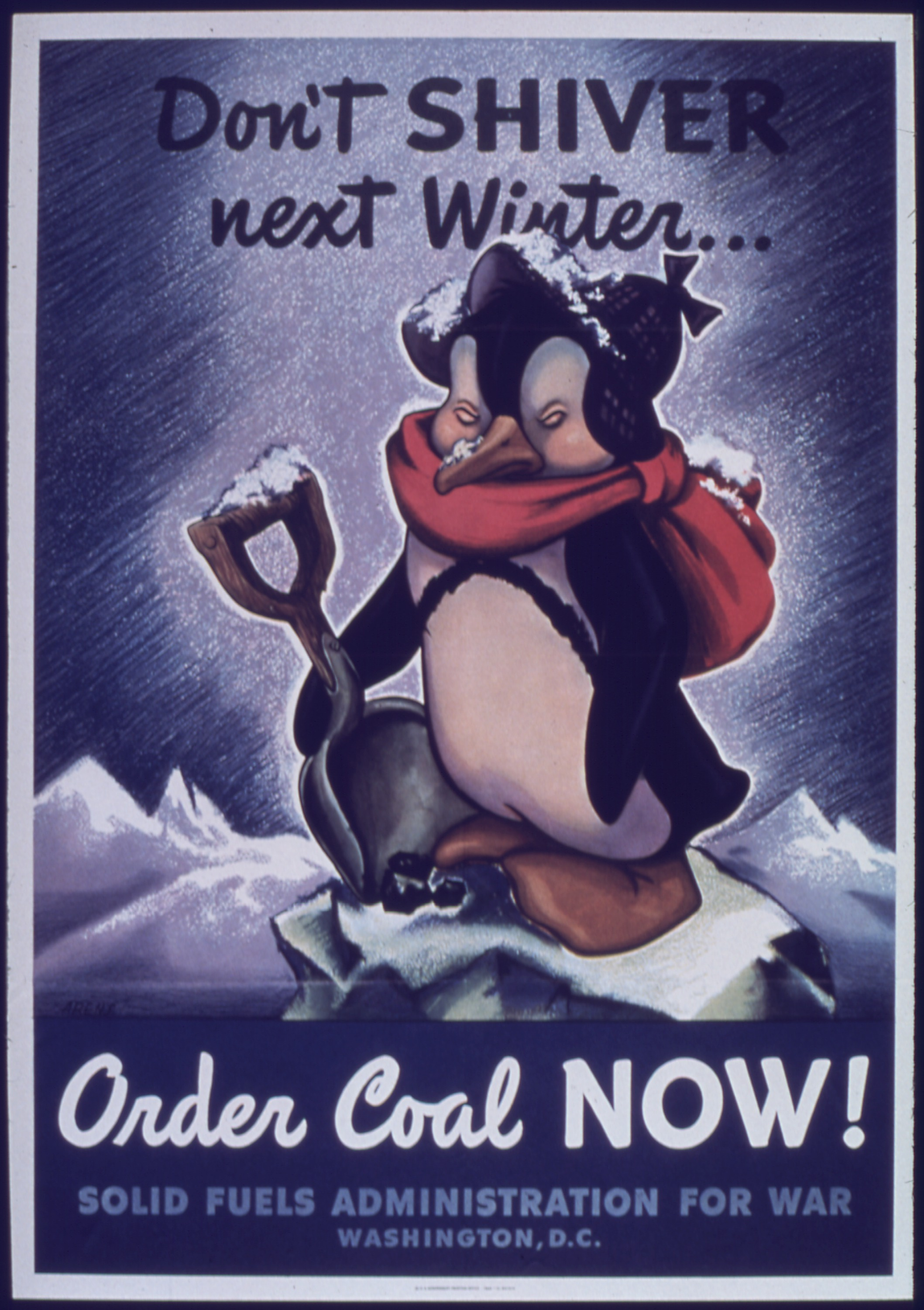
- Solid Fuels Administration for War poster

Agency overview
- Formed: March 19, 1943
- Preceding agencies: Office of Solid Fuels Coordinator for War (SFCW, 1942-43); Office of Solid Fuels Coordinator for National Defense (SFCND, 1941-42); Department of the Interior (1939-43); National Bituminous Coal Commission (NBCC, 1937-39) Bituminous Coal Division (BCD)
- Dissolved: June 30, 1947
- Superseding agency: Department of the Interior, liquidator
- Parent agency: Department of the Interior

The Solid Fuels Administration for War (SFAW) was a U.S. federal agency that administered wartime government controls on solid fuels industries.

According to Executive Order 9332 Establishing the Solid Fuels Administration for War,

The term "solid fuels" includes all forms of anthracite, bituminous, sub-bituminous, and lignitic coals (including packaged and processed fuels, such as briquettes) ...

The term "solid fuels industries" means the development, production, preparation, treatment, processing, storage, shipment, receipt, and distribution of solid fuels within the United States, its territories and possessions, but does not include the transportation of solid fuels.

It also advised other agencies, such as the Office of Defense Transportation, the War Shipping Administration, and the War Manpower Commission concerning solid fuels production, pricing, transportation, and distribution.

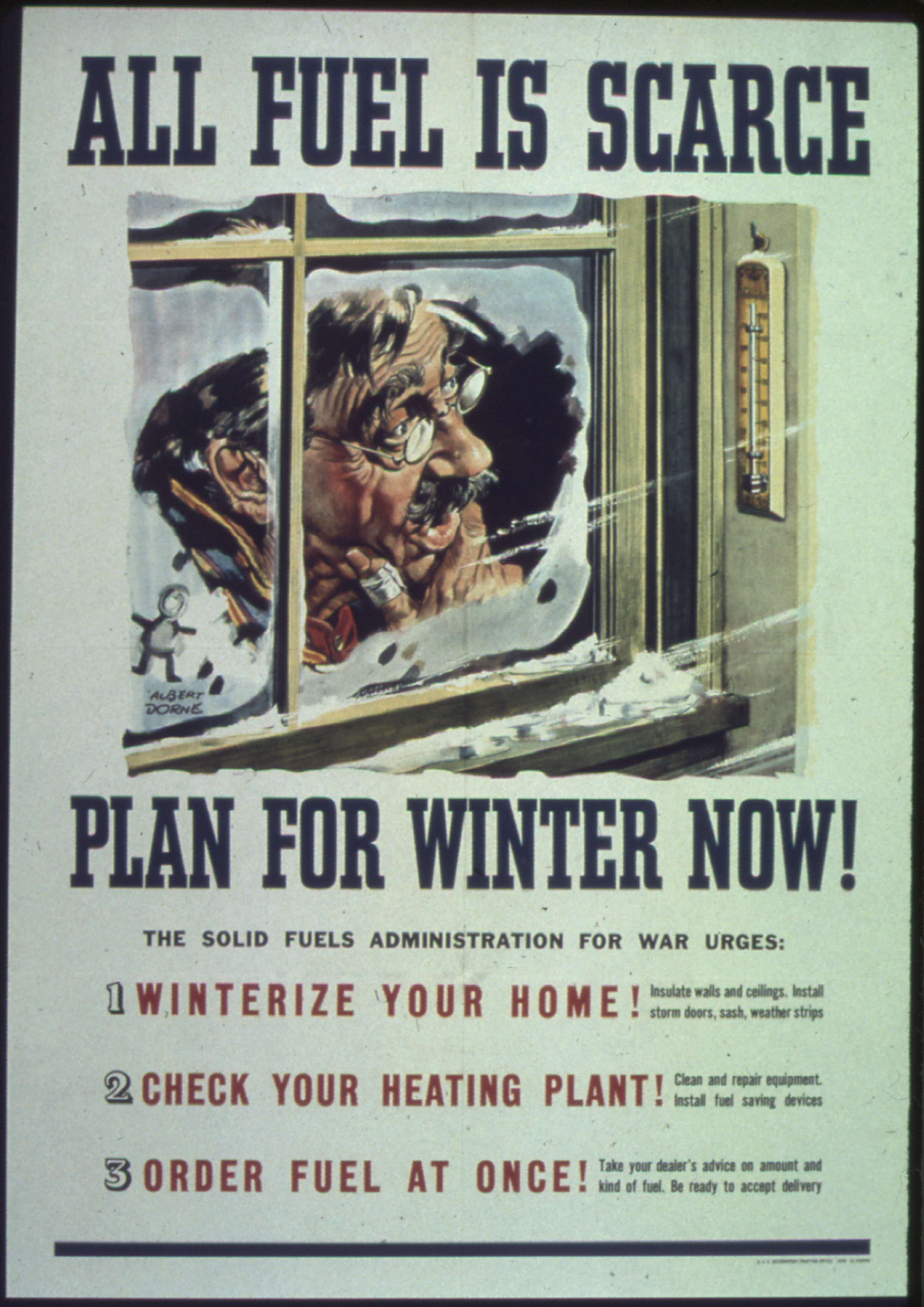
"All fuel is scarce ... plan for winter now."

It operated government-seized coal mines, either directly or through cooperation with successive Coal Mines Administrations.

It was established within the Department of the Interior by EO 9332, April 19, 1943, replacing the Office of Solid Fuels Coordinator for War; and absorbing functions of the abolished Bituminous Coal Division, Department of the Interior, August 24, 1943.

It was abolished, effective June 30, 1947, by EO 9847, May 6, 1947.

== See also ==
- Don Hilary Gingery
