= List of executive actions by Woodrow Wilson =

The president of the United States may take any of several kinds of executive actions.

Executive orders are issued to help officers and agencies of the executive branch manage the operations within the federal government itself. Presidential memoranda are closely related, and have the force of law on the Executive Branch, but are generally considered less prestigious. Presidential memoranda do not have an established process for issuance, and unlike executive orders, they are not numbered. A presidential determination results in an official policy or position of the executive branch of the United States government. A presidential proclamation is a statement issued by a president on a matter of public policy, under specific authority granted to the president by Congress, typically on a matter of widespread interest. Administrative orders are signed documents such as notices, letters, and orders, that can be issued to conduct administrative operations of the federal government. A presidential notice or a presidential sequestration order can also be issued.

Listed below are executive orders numbered 1744–3415 and presidential proclamations signed by United States President Woodrow Wilson (1913–1921). He issued 1803 executive orders. His executive orders are also listed on Wikisource, along with his presidential proclamations.

Signature of Woodrow Wilson

== Executive orders ==
=== 1913 ===
Relative No.	Absolute No.	Title/Description	Date signed
1	1744	Mabel P. Leroy, Clerk in the Interior Department, Again Designated to Sign President's Name to Land Patents	March 10, 1913
2	1745	Charles Earl, Solicitor of the Commerce Dept. Designated to Act as Labor Secretary During the Absence of the Labor Secretary and the Assistant Secretary	March 11, 1913
3	1746	Executive Order No. 1438 of November 23, 1911, Placing Certain Lands Between Hot Springs and Fort Gibbon, Alaska, Under the Control of the Interior Secretary Revoked; and Said Lands Reserved for the Use of the Signal Corps.	March 14, 1913
4	1747	Pine Mountain Administrative Site, Oregon, Created as a Ranger Station in the Administration of Deschutes National Forest	March 17, 1913
5	1748	Edward H. Hayden made eligible for appointment to position in classified service of Treasury Department without regard to Civil Service Rules	March 18, 1913
6	1749	Providing for the Protection of Birds and Their Nests in the Canal Zone	March 19, 1913
7	1750	Modification In Application of Safety Appliance Acts	March 19, 1913
8	1751	To Amend an Executive Order Approved February 5, 1912, Providing an Inexpensive Method for the Administration of the Estates of Deceased and Insane Persons in Certain Cases, Etc.	March 20, 1913
9	1752	Relating to Foreign Corporations	March 20, 1913
10	1752½	Revoking Executive Order No. 1718 of February 26, 1913, Changing Gregory Land Office to Carter, South Dakota	March 21, 1913
11	1753	Designating Martin A. Knapp as Chairman of the Interstate Commerce Commission	March 22, 1913
12	1754	Designating Mary K. Gulick as Land Patent Signer in the Interior Department	March 22, 1913
13	1755	Suspending Executive Order No. 1722½ of February 26, 1913, Concerning Claims for Injuries to Employees on the Panama Canal	March 24, 1913
14	1756	Executive Order No. 1719 of February 26, 1913, Transferring Certain Lands from the Chamberlain Land District, S. Dakota, to the Pierre Land District, Amended to Diminish the Lands So Transferred	March 24, 1913
15	1757	Penal Bonds of the Receivers of Public Moneys for Specified Places Prescribed	March 26, 1913
16	1758	Charles P. Neill, Commissioner of Labor Statistics, Designated to Act as Labor Secretary During the Absence of the Labor Secretary and the Assistant Secretary	March 31, 1913
17	1759	Transferring Certain Described Lands in North Dakota from Fargo Land District to the Devil's Lake Land District	April 15, 1913
18	1760	Consolidating Fargo Land District with Bismarck Land District, North Dakota	April 15, 1913
19	1761	To Provide Maritime Quarantine Regulations for the Canal Zone	April 15, 1913
20	1762	Withdrawing Certain Described Lands in Oregon Pending Legislation to Grant Them to the State for Park Purposes	April 18, 1913
21	1763	Establishing Walker Lake Reservation, Arkansas, as a Preserve and Breeding Ground for Native Birds	April 21, 1913
22	1764	Certain Described Lands Near Kluckwan, Alaska, Reserved for Use of Natives of the Indigenous Alaskan Race	April 21, 1913
23	1765	Modification of Executive Order No. 1661 of December 12, 1912, Reserving Certain Lands at Port Angeles, Washington	April 21, 1913
24	1766	Theodore T. Kirk Made Eligible for Appointment as Mechanical Draftsman in the Navy Dept. Without Regard to Civil Service Rules	April 21, 1913
25	1767	Enlarging Fort Ruger Military Reservation, Oahu, Territory of Hawaii	April 28, 1913
26	1768	Amending Civil Service Rules Regarding Noncompetitive Examinations for Interstate Commerce Commission Personnel	April 23, 1913
27	1769	Amending Civil Service Rules Regarding Positions Excepted from Examination for Interstate Commerce Commission Personnel	April 23, 1913
28	1770	Mary E. Netherland Made Eligible for Transfer from Clerk to Sign Tribal Deeds to a Regular Clerkship in the Interior Department Without Regard to Civil Service Rules	May 1, 1913
29	1771	Authorizing Swend. A. Swendsen to Position in Competitive Classified Service	May 5, 1913
30	1772	Reserving Land in California for Use of Nevada or Colony Indians	May 6, 1913
31	1773	Certain Described Lands in Montana Transferred, with the Business and Archives Pertaining Thereto, from the Helena Land District, to the Kalispell Land District	May 6, 1913
32	1774	Reserving Lands in New Mexico for Use of Navajo Indians	May 6, 1913
33	1775	Petit Bois Island Reservation, Gulf of Mexico, Established as a Preserve and Breeding Ground for Native Birds	May 6, 1913
34	1776	Amending Civil Service Rules Regarding Competitive Status for Fourth Class Postmasters	May 7, 1913
35	1777	Amending Civil Service Rules to Omit Chief Post-Office Inspector from Excepted Positions	May 7, 1913
36	1778	Amending Civil Service Rules Regarding Appointment for Fourth Class Postmasters	May 7, 1913
37	1779	John E. Hollingsworth Made Eligible for Reinstatement as Post Office Inspector Without Regard to Length of Separation from the Service	May 7, 1913
38	1780	Romus F. Stuart Made Eligible for Reinstatement as Post Office Inspector Without Regard to Length of Separation from the Service	May 7, 1913
39	1781	Albert Lee Thurman, Solicitor of the Commerce Department, Designated to Act as Commerce Secretary During the Absence of the Commerce Secretary and the Assistant Secretary	May 27, 1913
40	1782	Gila River Indian Reservation, Arizona, Enlarged	June 2, 1913
41	1783		June 5, 1913
42	1784	Amending Civil Service Rules Regarding Excepted Positions for Clerks to Heads of Bureaus Appointed by the President	June 6, 1913
43	1785		June 9, 1913
44	1786	Withdrawing Public Lands in Arizona for Purpose of Classification	June 11, 1913
45	1787		June 17, 1913
46	1788		June 17, 1913
47	1789		June 23, 1913
48	1790		June 27, 1913
49	1791		June 27, 1913
50	1792	Jury Trials in the Canal Zone	June 30, 1913
51	1793		July 3, 1913
52	1794	Certain Described Lands in Alabama Withdrawn Pending Classification and Designation as a Nucleus for a Forest Purchase Area	July 3, 1913
53	1795		July 3, 1913
54	1796		July 14, 1913
55	1797		July 15, 1913
56	1798	Revoking Executive Order of May 29, 1912, Which Reserved Lands for Walapai Indians	July 18, 1913
57	1799		July 18, 1913
58	1800		July 21, 1913
59	1801		July 21, 1913
60	1802		July 21, 1913
61	1803	Amending Civil Service Rules to Except Private Secretary to Public Printer from Examination	July 23, 1913
62	1804		July 24, 1913
63	1805		July 26, 1913
64	1806		July 26, 1913
65	1807		July 30, 1913
66	1808	Amending Civil Service Rules to Except Temporary Detective Employees in Internal Revenue Service from Examination	August 2, 1913
67	1809		August 6, 1913
68	1810	To Prohibit the Unauthorized Use of Flying Machines	August 7, 1913
69	1811		August 9, 1913
70	1812	Appointing Richard Lee Metcalfe to the Isthmian Canal Commission	August 9, 1913
71	1813		August 20, 1913
72	1814		August 25, 1913
73	1815		August 25, 1913
74	1816		August 25, 1913
75	1817	Relating to Bail Bonds and Money Deposits in Lieu Thereof, and to Amend Section 310 of Criminal Procedure of the Canal Zone	August 29, 1913
76	1818		August 29, 1913
77	1819	Establishing Anaho Island Reservation as Preserve for Native Birds	September 4, 1913
78	1820		September 4, 1913
79	1821		September 4, 1913
80	1822		September 11, 1913
81	1823		September 17, 1913
82	1824		September 17, 1913
83	1825		September 17, 1913
84	1826		September 17, 1913
85	1827		September 18, 1913
86	1828		September 18, 1913
87	1829	Amending Civil Service Rules Regarding Employees Exempted from Examination in Agriculture Department	September 22, 1913
88	1830		September 24, 1913
89	1831		September 25, 1913
90	1832	To Punish Deported Persons Who Return to the Canal Zone	September 25, 1913
91	1833		September 29, 1913
92	1833½	Use of Roller Towels and Other Towels for Use by More than One Person in Federal Buildings Discontinued	September 30, 1913
93	1834		October 1, 1913
94	1835		October 1, 1913
95	1836		October 1, 1913
96	1837	Amending Civil Service Rules Regarding Noncompetitive Examinations for Junior Clerks in Office of Indian Affairs	October 14, 1913
97	1838		October 16, 1913
98	1839		October 17, 1913
99	1840		October 17, 1913
100	1841		October 21, 1913
101	1842		October 21, 1913
102	1843		October 22, 1913
103	1844		October 22, 1913
104	1845		October 22, 1913
105	1846		October 24, 1913
106	1847		October 29, 1913
107	1848		October 29, 1913
108	1849		October 29, 1913
109	1850		October 29, 1913
110	1851	Amending Civil Service Rules Regarding Positions Excepted from Examination for Interstate Commerce Commission Personnel	October 29, 1913
111	1852		October 30, 1913
112	1853		October 30, 1913
113	1854		November 1, 1913
114	1855		November 3, 1913
115	1856		November 5, 1913
116	1857	To Regulate the Carrying of Arms in the Canal Zone	November 7, 1913
117	1858		November 8, 1913
118	1859		November 8, 1913
119	1860	Fixing the Rate of Interest on Money	November 11, 1913
120	1861		November 18, 1913
121	1862	Ordering that New Structures Erected in District of Columbia and Other Matters Related to Art Be Submitted to Commission of Fine Art	November 28, 1913
122	1863		December 1, 1913
123	1864		December 1, 1913
124	1865		December 5, 1913
125	1866		December 5, 1913
126	1867		December 10, 1913
127	1868		December 15, 1913
128	1869		December 15, 1913
129	1870		December 15, 1913
130	1871		December 18, 1913
131	1872		December 22, 1913
132	1873		December 22, 1913
133	1874	Albert K. Brown, Made Eligible for Promotion Without Regard to Civil Service Rules on Examination	December 22, 1913
134	1875	Anita H. Stephens, Exemption From Civil Service Rules on Examination	December 22, 1913

=== 1914 ===
Relative No.	Absolute No.	Title/Description	Date signed
135	1876	Oregon, Withdrawal of Certain Described Lands for Classification and Pending Legislation	January 14, 1914
136	1877	Creation of Allen Administrative Site, Montana, for Use in the Administration of Unascertained	January 14, 1914
137	1878	Colorado, Withdrawal of Certain Described Lands Pending Legislation Creating a Protected Water Supply for the City of Black Hawk	January 16, 1914
138	1879	Edith P. Johnson, Exemption From Civil Service Rules on Eligibility of Retention	January 19, 1914
139	1880	Canal Zone Regulations to Prevent the Corrupt Influencing of Agents, Employees or Servants	January 21, 1914
140	1881	Francis H. Duehay, Exemption From Civil Service Rules on Eligibility for Appointment	January 24, 1914
141	1882	Eliza Ryon, Exemption From Civil Service Rules on Eligibility for Reinstatement	January 24, 1914
142	1883	Revoking Portions of Executive Order No. 1324½ of March 28, 1911, Reserving Public Lands Within National Forest, Alaska	January 24, 1914
143	1884	To Prevent Fire-Hunting at Night, and Hunting by Means of a Spring or Trap in the Canal Zone, and to Repeal the Executive Order No. 1106 of September 8, 1909	January 27, 1914
144	1885	To Establish a Permanent Organization for the Panama Canal	January 27, 1914
145	1886		January 30, 1914
146	1887		January 31, 1914
147	1888	Providing Conditions of Employment for the Permanent Force for the Panama Canal	February 2, 1914
148	1889		February 3, 1914
149	1890		February 5, 1914
150	1896		February 24, 1914
151	1897	To Establish a Washington Office of The Panama Canal	March 2, 1914
152	1898	Relating to the Canal Zone Judiciary	March 12, 1914
153	1902	Providing Method for Determination and Adjustment of All Claims Arising out of Personal Injuries to Employees Engaged in Actual Work on Panama Canal or Panama Railroad	March 20, 1914
154	1903	Certain Described Lands in Utah Reserved for the Goshute and Other Indians	March 23, 1914
155	1909		March 30, 1914
156	1910		April 2, 1914
157	1917	Establishing Regulations Relative to the Payment of Tolls and of Bills for Materials, Supplies, Repairs, Harbor Pilotage, Towage, and Other Services, Furnished to Vessels by the Panama Canal	April 16, 1914
158	1919½	Certain Described Lands in Alaska Reserved for Townsite Purposes	April 21, 1914
159	1920	Reserving Land Near Klawak, Alaska, for Use of the United States Bureau of Education and Indigenous Alaskans	April 21, 1914
160	1920½		April 21, 1914
161	1926	Relating to Salaries of Consular Officers	April 30, 1914
162	1927		May 2, 1914
163	1930		May 5, 1914
164	1938	Relating to Pardons, the Remission of Fines and Forfeitures and Other Subjects \	May 13, 1914
165	1944	To Create a Committee to Formally and Officially Open the Panama Canal	May 20, 1914
166	1947		May 26, 1914
167	1948	Balboa Naval Radio Station	May 26, 1914
168	1951		May 29, 1914
169	1951½	Modification of Previous Orders Fixing Royalty Rates for Oil Produced in Osage Indian Reservation, Arkansas	June 1, 1914
170	1952		June 2, 1914
171	1959	Establishing Smith Island Reservation for the Protection of Native Birds	June 6, 1914
172	1964	Amending the Civil Service Transfer Rules	June 15, 1914
173	1967		June 19, 1914
174	1967-A		June 23, 1914
175	1968		June 27, 1914
176	1975	Relating to Certain Duties of the Clerk of the District Court and His Assistant	July 3, 1914
177	1988	To Require Ocean-Going Vessels to be Fitted With Wireless Apparatus	July 9, 1914
178	1989	Authorizing the Board of Admeasurement to Administer Oaths to Witnesses and to Compel their Attendance	July 9, 1914
179	1990	Rules and Regulations for the Operation and Navigation of the Panama Canal	July 9, 1914
180	1991		July 9, 1914
181	1995	Military Reservation for National Guard	July 23, 1914
182	1997	Amending the Civil Service Rules Providing for the Appointment of Aliens When No Citizens Are Available	July 25, 1914
183	1999	Governing the Inspection of Returns of Corporations, Joint Stock Companies, Associations, or Insurance Companies	July 28, 1914
184	2002	Authorizing Teinstatement of J.N. Gilbert to Position of Storekeeper-Gauger in Internal Revenue Service in Tennessee	July 28, 1914
185	2006	Darien Naval Radio Station	July 30, 1914
186	2007	Prescribing the Duties of Constables	August 3, 1914
187	2011	To Enforce Neutrality of Wireless Stations	August 5, 1914
188	2012	For the Relief, Protection and Transportation Home of Americans in Europe at the Outbreak of the European War of 1914	August 5, 1914
189	2013	Establishing Board of Relief for Benefit of Americans Stranded Abroad During the European War of 1914	August 6, 1914
190	2014	To Reorganize the Board of Health of The Canal Zone	August 6, 1914
191	2015		August 7, 1914
192	2016	Relating to the Customs Service	August 8, 1914
193	2017	Giving the Treasury Department Full Authority to All Customs Officers in the Enforcement of the Neutrality Laws During Emergency	August 8, 1914
194	2018	Relating to Postal Crimes in the Canal Zone	August 14, 1914
195	2019	To Require Security for Costs in Civil Cases	August 14, 1914
196	2020	To Amend the Executive Order to Provide Maritime Quarantine Regulations for the Canal Zone	August 14, 1914
197	2021	Amending the Rules Governing the Granting of Passports	August 14, 1914
198	2022	Temporary Waiver of Fees for Visaing and Issuing Emergency Passports	August 14, 1914
199	2023	Chuckekanzie	August 14, 1914
200	2024	For a Lookout Station at Twin Sisters Administrative Site (Near Colorado National Forest), Colorado	August 17, 1914
201	2026	Regulating Operation of Street Railway Cars at Crossings	August 22, 1914
202	2029	Transferring Deadmans Island to the Health Service	August 26, 1914
203	2031	Designating Customs Collection Districts	August 27, 1914
204	2037	To Amend the Rules and Regulations for the Operation and Navigation of the Panama Canal, Etc.	September 3, 1914
205	2039	Admitting Foreign-Built Ships to American Registry	September 4, 1914
206	2040	To Repeal the Executive Order Establishing the Postal Savings System in the Canal Zone	September 5, 1914
	2041	Withdrawing Public Lands for Lighthouse Reservation at or Near Cape St. Elias, Alaska	September 5, 1914
207	2042	Taking Over High-Power Radio Station for Use of the Government	September 5, 1914
208	2043	Further Amendment of Regulations Governing the Punishment of Enlisted Men and General Prisoners	September 5, 1914
209	2044	Appointing Experts for War Risk Insurance in Treasury Department	September 10, 1914
210	2045	Combining Manzano and Zuni National Forests in Arizona and New Mexico	September 10, 1914
211	2046	Ranger Station for Clear Creek Administrative Site Near Coconino National Forest, Arizona	September 15, 1914
212	2047	Setting Aside Public Land for an Elk Refugee	September 15, 1914
213	2048	To Divide Administrative Site Within Oregon National Forest, Oregon	September 15, 1914
214	2051	To Amend the Canal Zone Law Against Gambling	September 18, 1914
215	2052	To Amend the Executive Order Relating to Compensation to be Paid to Injured Employees of the Panama Canal	September 19, 1914
216	2060	Alaskan Townsite Withdrawal No. 4	October 8, 1914
217	2062	Providing for License Taxes and Fees	October 13, 1914
218	2067	Gray's Lake Administrative Site (Near Caribou National Forest) Idaho	October 28, 1914
219	2069½		October 28, 1914
220	2071		October 31, 1914
221	2073	Amending "Rules and Regulations for the Operation and Navigation of the Panama Canal"	November 4, 1914
222	2090	Consolidating Customs Collection Districts Nos. 2 and 3, in the State of Vermont, With Headquarters at St. Albans and Prescribing the Salary of the Collector	November 21, 1914
223	2113	Calvin Satterfield Made Eligible for Appointment as Chief of the Accounts Division, Justice Dept., Without Regard to Civil Service Rules	December 30, 1914

=== 1915 ===
Relative No.	Absolute No.	Title/Description	Date signed
224	2114	Fred W. Carrington Made Eligible for Promotion from Assistant Messenger in the Pensions Bureau to the Clerical Grade Without Examination	January 5, 1915
225	2115		January 7, 1915
226	2116		January 7, 1915
227	2117		January 9, 1915
228	2118	Amendment of Executive Order No. 1761 of April 15, 1913, Prescribing Maritime Quarantine Regulations for the Canal Zone	January 11, 1915
229	2119		January 12, 1915
230	2119-A	Rules Governing the Granting and Issuing of Passports in the United States	January 12, 1915
231	2120	Conditions of Employment [Governing Employees of the Panama Canal]	January 15, 1915
232	2121	Amending the Civil Service Rules	January 19, 1915
233	2135	Establishing Regulations Governing the Accounting to the Treasury of the United States for Panama Canal Collections	February 4, 1915
234	2138	Military Reservation for National Guard	February 19, 1915
235	2142	Relative to the Production, Etc. of Opium and Coca Leaves in the Canal Zone	March 1, 1915
236	2152	Reinstatement of Dr. Edward P. Beverley in the Panama Canal Service	March 23, 1915
237	2154		March 25, 1915
238	2164	Vessel Registrations	May 15, 1915
239	2185	Renaming the Panama Canal's Culebra Cut to Gaillard Cut	June 8, 1915
240	2204	Panama Canal Employee Rent/Fuel Regulations	May 25, 1915
241	2208	Flag of the Governor of the Panama Canal Zone	June 8, 1915
242	2212	White River National Forest, Colorado	June 15, 1915
242	2230	Establishing Big Lake Reservation, Arkansas, as a Preserve and Breeding Ground for Native Birds	August 2, 1915
243	2230½	Authorizing Eligibility for Appointment of Norma H. Spencer as a Classified Clerk in the Treasury Department Without Regard to Civil Service Rules	August 5, 1915
244	2231	Authorizing Eligibility for Appointment of Francis J. Reinhard as a Law Clerk in the Office of the Solicitor of Treasury Department Without Regard to Civil Service Rules	August 6, 1915
245	2233	Coos Bay, Oregon, Withdrawal of Certain Described Lands for Military Purposes	August 6, 1915
246	2234	Philippine Islands, Withdrawal of Certain Described Lands for Military Purposes	August 13, 1915
247	2245	Authorizing Eligibility for Appointment of James O. Brockenshire as Inspector of Musical Instruments in the Army Quartermaster Corps. Without Examination	September 14, 1915
248	2245½	Civil Service Rules Waived for the Appointment	September 14, 1915
249	2245-A		September 14, 1915
250	2245-B		September 14, 1915
251	2246	Certain Described Lands in Alabama, Bordering on the Tennessee River, Temporarily Withdrawn for Use by the War Dept. for Improvement of the Navigation of Said River	September 17, 1915
252	2247		September 20, 1915
253	2247½	Authorizing Eligibility for Appointment of Edith Gilbert Leadly to a Clerical Position in the Commerce Department Without Regard to Civil Service Rules	September 22, 1915
254	2248	Authorizing Eligibility for Appointment of Shelley Inch as a Clerk in the Placerville, California, Post Office Without Regard to Civil Service Rules	September 23, 1915
255	2252		October 6, 1915
256	2262	Prescribing Consular Regulations for Maintaining the Rights and Enforcing the Duties of American Sailors in Foreign Ports	October 21, 1915
257	2268	Establishing a United States Sheep Experiment Station	October 30, 1915
258	2269	Suspending Operation of the Act to Promote the Welfare of American Seamen and to Forbid Their Arrest and Imprisonment for Desertion	November 2, 1915
259	2281	Certain Described Lands in Alabama Reserved for Military Purposes	December 6, 1915
260	2285	Requiring American Citizens Traveling Abroad to Procure Passports	December 15, 1915
261	2286	Authorizing Eligibility for Reinstatement of Arabella N. McDonald as an Operative in the Bureau of Engraving and Printing Without Regard to Length of Separation From the Service	December 16, 1915
262	2286-A	Prescribing Regulations Governing the Granting and Issuing of Passports in the United States	December 16, 1915
263	2287	Diminishment of Coconino National Forest, Arizona	December 18, 1915
264	2294	Certain Described Lands in Oklahoma Reserved for Agency and Educational Purposes in Connection With the Administration of the Cheyenne and Arapaho Indian Agency	December 29, 1915

=== 1916 ===
Relative No.	Absolute No.	Title/Description	Date signed
265	2295	Certain Described Lands in Arizona Reserved as a Rifle Range for the Tucson and University of Arizona Rifle Clubs	January 1, 1916
266	2296		January 6, 1916
267	2297		January 11, 1916
268	2298		January 11, 1916
269	2300	Further Reserving Additional Described Lands for Use by the Papago Indians, Arizona	January 14, 1916
270	2303	Abolishing Port of Entry at Charlotte, N. Y., Located in Customs Collection District 8	January 28, 1916
271	2304	Order of Withdrawal of a Strip of Land from Sturgeon Bay Government Reservation for Extension of Public Road; Door County, Wisconsin	January 28, 1916
272	2316	Camp Eldridge, Philippine Islands, Reserving Additional Described Lands for Military Purposes	February 14, 1916
273	2322	Porto Rico, Transfer of Certain Described Lands from War Department to Navy Department for Naval Radio Purposes	February 21, 1916
274	2323	Fort Armstrong, Hawaii, Transfer of Certain Described Lands from Navy Department to War Department	February 21, 1916
275	2325	Amending Executive Order of February 14, 1912	February 23, 1916
276	2328	Fort Rosencrans, California, Inter-Transfer of Certain Described Lands Between Navy Department and War Department	February 25, 1916
277	2335	Restoring Certain Reserved Lands for Military Purposes to the Government of the Territory of Hawaii	March 6, 1916
278	2341	Relating to Cancellation and Reissue of Passports	March 13, 1916
279	2345	Increasing the Strength of the Regular Army	March 21, 1916
280	2357	Amending Civil Service Rules [Revoking Rule 5, Sec. 3, So as to Admit Enlisted Men to Examinations]	April 11, 1916
281	2357-A		April 11, 1916
282	2358		April 12, 1916
283	2362		April 17, 1916
284	2362-A	Amending Rules Governing the Granting and Issuing of Passports	April 17, 1916
285	2362		April 20, 1916
286	2377	Restoring Control of Fort Brown, Texas Military Reservation to the War Department	May 2, 1916
287	2382	Protection of the Panama Canal During Time of War	May 17, 1916
288	2390	Flag of the United States, and Flag of the President of the United States	May 29, 1916
289	2392	Restoring Certain Described Lands and Transferring Control of Such to Interior Department	June 5, 1916
290	2405		June 19, 1916
291	2405-A		June 19, 1916
292	2406		June 23, 1916
293	2410	Authorizing Appointments of Warren J. Brown, Henry C. Mansfield, and Florence E. Cleveland as Clerks in Classified Service	June 30, 1916
294	2413	Waving Citizenship Requirements for Specified Federal Appointment	June 30, 1916
295	2414		June 30, 1916
296	2415	Further Modifying Boundaries of Datil National Forest, N. Mex., by Excluding Therefrom Part of Former Hot Springs Indian Reservation	July 3, 1916
297	2418	Regulations for Sale of the Federal and Cliff Additions to Seward Townsite, Alaska	July 11, 1916
298	2428	Establishing Regulations Providing Conditions under which The Panama Canal and the Panama Railroad Company Employees on the Isthmus of Panama may be Allowed the Use of Quarters, Fuel and Electric Current	July 25, 1916
299	2240	Modification of Executive Order No. 2428, dated July 25, 1916, Establishing Regulations Providing Conditions Under which the Panama Canal and the Panama Railroad Employees on the Isthmus of Panama May be Allowed the Use of Quarters, Fuel and Electric Current	August 10, 1916
300	2451	Relating to Motor Vehicles, and Their Operation in the Roads of the Canal Zone	September 5, 1916
301	2455	Transferring to the Governor of The Panama Canal the Administration of the Act Approved September 7, 1916, So Far as Panama Canal and Panama Railroad Employees Are Concerned	September 15, 1916
302	2456	Philippines—Requiring Governor General to Report to Secretary of War	September 19, 1916
303	2461	Amending Consular Regulations 172	September 28, 1916
304	2462	Amending Consular Regulations 692	September 28, 1916
305	2465		September 30, 1916
306	2465-A		September 30, 1916
307	2466		October 2, 1916
308	2475	Authorizing the Commutation of Leave Privileges in Certain Cases	October 17, 1916
309	2479	Providing for the Payment of Interest on Deposit Money Orders Issued in the Canal Zone	October 22, 1916
310	2493	Extension of Trust Period on Allotments for Absentee Shawnee and Citizen Pottawatomie Indians, Oklahoma	November 24, 1916
311	2496	Diminishment of Coronado National Forest, Arizona	December 7, 1916
312	2497	Wyoming, Land Withdrawal for Water Supply Purposes	December 7, 1916
313	2498	Prescribing Army Punishment Regulations During Time of Peace	December 16, 1916
314	2499	William C. Rader, Exemption From Civil Service Rules on Appointment	December 20, 1916
315	2500	Hattie M. Miller, Made Eligible for Promotion, Exemption From Civil Service Rules on Examination	December 20, 1916
316	2501		December 20, 1916
317	2502		December 28, 1916

=== 1917 ===
Relative No.	Absolute No.	Title/Description	Date signed
318	2503	Dolley Farrior, Exemption From Civil Service Rules on Appointment	January 3, 1917
319	2504	Unascertained Abolished as A Port of Entry in Customs Collection District No. 38	January 3, 1917
320	2505	Extension of Trust or Any Other Period of Restriction Against Alienation in Patents Issued to Any Indian Indian for land on the Public Domain	January 3, 1917
321	2506		January 3, 1917
322	2507	Diminishment of Sierra National Forest, California, and Said Lands Made Open for Settlement	January 3, 1917
323	2508	Establishment of Norton Bay Reservation, Alaska	January 3, 1917
324	2509	Frank Kearney Made Eligible for Promotion from Messenger to Clerk in Treasury Department without Regard to Civil Service Rules	January 5, 1917
325	2510	Diminishment of Petroleum Reserve Nos. 15 and 30, California	January 9, 1917
326	2511	Withdrawing Certain Described Lands in New Mexico for Classification and Possible Inclusion Within the Gran Quivira National Reserve	January 11, 1917
327	2512	Extending Trust Period on Allotments Expiring in 1917 for Ten Years in Oklahoma	January 15, 1917
328	2513	Reserving Certain Described Lands in New Mexico for Use by...	January 15, 1917
329	2514	Relating to Conditions of Employment in the Panama Canal Service	January 15, 1917
330	2515	Creating an Inter-Departmental Board on Location of Nitrate Plants	January 15, 1917
331	2516	Ordering Mourning Formalities for Death of Admiral George Dewey	January 17, 1917
332	2517	Reserving Certain Described Lands in New Mexico for Military Purposes	January 18, 1917
333	2518		January 19, 1917
334	2519	Corry, Pa., Abolished as Port of Entry in Customs Collection District No. 41	January 23, 1917
335	2519-A	Prescribing Rules Governing the Granting and Issuing of Passports in the United States	January 24, 1917
336	2520		January 25, 1917
337	2521		January 26, 1917
338	2522		January 30, 1917
339	2523		January 30, 1917
340	2524	Reserving Certain Lands in the State of Arizona for the Papago Indians in Arizona	February 1, 1917
341	2525	Amending Executive Order No. 2508 of January 3, 1917, Entitled ‘‘Norton Bay Reservation’’	February 6, 1917
342	2526	Relating to the Exclusion of Chinese from the Panama Canal Zone	February 6, 1917
343	2527		February 6, 1917
344	2528		February 14, 1917
345	2529		February 14, 1917
346	2530		February 14, 1917
347	2531		February 16, 1917
348	2532		February 17, 1917
349	2533	Naval Radio Stations for Alaska	February 20, 1917
350	2534		February 20, 1917
351	2535		February 21, 1917
352	2536		February 21, 1917
353	2537	Naval Radio Stations for Alaska	February 21, 1917
354	2538		February 26, 1917
355	2539		February 26, 1917
356	2540		February 27, 1917
357	2541		February 27, 1917
358	2542		February 28, 1917
359	2542-A		March 4, 1917
360	2543		March 13, 1917
361	2544		March 15, 1917
362	2545		March 17, 1917
363	2546		March 21, 1917
364	2547		March 21, 1917
365	2548		March 21, 1917
366	2549		March 21, 1917
367	2550		March 21, 1917
368	2551		March 21, 1917
369	2552	Order of Withdrawal of Certain Public Lands for Lighthouse Purposes; Alaska	March 21, 1917
370	2553		March 21, 1917
371	2554	Allowing More than Eight Hours of Labor in a Day for Workers in Navy Yards	March 22, 1917
372	2555		March 22, 1917
373	2556		March 22, 1917
374	2557		March 23, 1917
375	2558		March 23, 1917
376	2559	Increasing Authorized Enlisted Strength of the Navy	March 24, 1917
377	2559-A	Allowing More than Eight Hours of Labor in a Day for Persons Working on Contracts for Military Ordnance, Supplies, Arsenal Buildings, and Fortifications	March 24, 1917
378	2560	Authorizing Civil Service Commission to Fill Position for Which There is No Suitable Eligible, by Appointment of Person Under Noncompetitive Examination	March 26, 1917
379	2561	Increasing Authorized Enlisted Strength of the Marine Corps	March 26, 1917
380	2562	Authorizing Examination of Matthew E. Hanna for Secretaryship in Diplomatic Service	March 27, 1917
381	2563	Vacating Executive Order of January 4, 1911, and Placing Control of Military Reservation of Fort Ringgold, Texas Under Control of War Department for Military Purposes	March 27, 1917
382	2564	Order of Withdrawal of Certain Public Lands for Military Purposes; Nanakuli, Hawaii	March 28, 1917
383	2565	Order of Withdrawal of Certain Public Lands for Military Purposes; Waimanalo, Hawaii	March 28, 1917
384	2566	Order of Withdrawal of Certain Public Lands for Military Purposes; Aiea, Hawaii	March 28, 1917
385	2567	Authorizing Appointment of Claude T. Worford as Draftsman in Naval Intelligence Office	March 29, 1917
386	2568	Extension of Credit for Governor of Virgin Islands to be Expended for All Necessary Expenses and to Meet Any Deficit in Revenues	March 29, 1917
387	2569	Authorizing Reinstatement of Lorraine J. Markwardt as Engineer in Forest Products in Agriculture Department	March 31, 1917
388	2569-A	Establishing Civil Service in First, Second and Third Classes of Post Offices	March 31, 1917
389	2570	Directing Civil Service Commission to Refuse Transfer Examinations Without Permission of Current Employer	April 2, 1917
390	2571	Constituting the Public Health Service a Part of the Military Forces of the United States in Times of War	April 3, 1917
391	2572	Temporarily Suspending Eight-Hour Law Provisions in the Department of Agriculture	April 3, 1917
392	2573	Authorizing Appointment of Gilbert J. Murray as Assistant to Director of War Risk Insurance Bureau in Treasury Department	April 3, 1917
393	2574	Designating Ellie D. Bouldin of General Land Office to Sign Land Patents During Absence of Clerk Regularly Designated for that Service	April 4, 1917
394	2575	Order of Withdrawal of Certain Public Lands for Military Purposes; New Mexico	April 4, 1917
395	2576		April 4, 1917
396	2577		April 4, 1917
397	2578		April 4, 1917
398	2579		April 4, 1917
399	2580		April 4, 1917
400	2581		April 4, 1917
401	2582		April 5, 1917
402	2583		April 5, 1917
403	2584	Establishing Defensive Sea Areas	April 5, 1917
404	2585	Taking Over Necessary and Closing Unnecessary Radio Stations	April 6, 1917
405	2586		April 6, 1917
406	2587	Directing the Coast Guard Operate as a Part of the Navy	April 7, 1917
407	2587-A	Federal Employees Removal on Security Grounds	April 7, 1917
408	2588	Transferring to the Service and Jurisdiction of the War and Navy Departments Certain Vessels, Equipment, Stations, and Personnel of the Lighthouse Service	April 11, 1917
409	2589	Alaskan Timber Reserve No. 1, Enlargement	April 11, 1917
410	2590	Alabama, Land Withdrawal for Classification and Pending Legislation for Forest Reserve Preserve	April 11, 1917
411	2591	Ottawa, Seneca and Wyandotte Indians, Extension of Trust Period on Allotments	April 11, 1917
412	2592	Mr. Henry J. Cantey, Exemption From Civil Service Rules on Promotion	April 11, 1917
413	2593	St. Francis River Basin, Arkansas, Land Withdrawal for Examination and Survey	April 13, 1917
414	2594	Creating Committee on Public Information	April 13, 1917
415	2595		April 14, 1917
416	2596	Allowing Treasury Department Employees to be Appointed on Defense Organizations	April 14, 1917
417	2597	Establishing Additional Defensive Sea Areas	April 14, 1917
418	2598	Mr. Henry Fox, Exemption From Civil Service Rules on Reinstatement	April 16, 1917
419	2599	Montana, Land Withdrawal for Classification and Pending Legislation for Game Preserve	April 16, 1917
420	2600	Exempting Council of National Defense from Civil Service Rules for Period of War	April 17, 1917
421	2601		April 18, 1917
422	2602	Cooperation Among Civil Service Commissions	April 18, 1917
423	2603		April 19, 1917
424	2604	Establishing Censorship of Submarine Cables, Telegraph and Telephone Lines	April 28, 1917
425	2605	Suspending Eight-Hour Law in Contracts Under the War Department	April 28, 1917
426	2605-A	Executive Order Assuming Control of Radio Communications	April 30, 1917
427	2606		May 4, 1917
428	2607		May 4, 1917
429	2608		May 4, 1917
430	2609		May 7, 1917
431	2610		May 7, 1917
432	2611		May 7, 1917
433	2612	Military Reservation for the National Guard	May 7, 1917
434	2612-A		May 8, 1917
435	2613		May 9, 1917
436	2614		May 9, 1917
437	6215		May 9, 1917
438	2616	Directing Transmission of Lists of Interned Alien Enemies Through the Red Cross	May 9, 1917
439	2617	Civil Service Commission Authorized to Permit Appointment of Civilians	May 11, 1917
440	2618		May 11, 1917
441	2619	Amending Consular Regulations and Forms	May 11, 1917
442	2619-A	German Boats	May 14, 1917
443	2620	Administration of Customs Laws in Virgin Islands	May 15, 1917
444	2621	German Boats	May 16, 1917
445	2622		May 17, 1917
446	2623		May 19, 1917
447	2624	German Boats	May 22, 1917
448	2625	German Boats	May 22, 1917
449	2626	Reinstating Certain Persons Formerly in the Competitive Service	May 22, 1917
450	2627		May 27, 1917
451	2628	Authorizing Employment of Foreign Inspectors in Munitions Factories	June 4, 1917
452	2629		June 6, 1917
453	2630		June 6, 1917
454	2631		June 6, 1917
455	2632		June 6, 1917
456	2633		June 6, 1917
457	2634		June 8, 1917
458	2635	German Boats	June 12, 1917
459	2636		June 12, 1917
460	2637		June 12, 1917
461	2638		June 12, 1917
462	2639		June 18, 1917
463	2640		June 18, 1917
464	2641	Amending Alaskan Railroad Townsite Regulations	June 18, 1917
465	2642		June 20, 1917
466	2643		June 20, 1917
467	2644		June 20, 1917
468	2645	Establishing the Exports Council	June 22, 1917
469	2646	Transferring Certain Land on Ediz Hook Spit, Port Angeles Harbor. Wash., from Control of Commerce Department to Navy Department	June 27, 1917
470	2647	Military Reservation at Eureka. Alaska, Set Apart by Executive Order of June 6, 1914, Placed Under Control of Secretary of Interior	June 28, 1917
471	2648	Authorizing Reinstatement of H. H. Chapman as Assistant District Forester Under Agriculture Department	June 28, 1917
472	2649	Designation of Anchorage Grounds at Quarantine Station on Cauit Island, Cebu, Philippine Islands	June 28, 1917
473	2650	Amending Civil Service Rules as to Except from Examination Watchmen at Warehouses, Depots, Wharves, and Piers Belonging to or Controlled by War Department	June 29, 1917
474	2651	Authorizing Shipping Board to Take Over 87 German Vessels Now Within Jurisdiction of United States	June 30, 1917
475	2652	Executive Order Regarding Watch Officers of American Vessels Registered for Foreign Trade	July 3, 1917
476	2653	Authorizing Shipping Board to Take Over German Vessel Prinz Eitel Friedrlch Now at Hoboken, N.J.	July 3, 1917
477	2654	Authorizing Appointment of J. M. Shaffer to Classified Position in the Treasury Department	July 5, 1917
478	2655	Authorizing Appointment of Mary C. Ritenour to Clerical Position in Classified Service	July 5, 1917
479	2656	Suspending the Eight-Hour Act of June 19, 1912, Construction of Post Office Equipment Shops	July 6, 1917
480	2656-A		July 6, 1917
481	2657	Authorizing Reinstatement of George B. Taylor to Position in War Department	July 10, 1917
482	2658	Agricultural Experiment Station, Matanuska Valley, Alaska	July 10, 1917
483	2659	Amending Civil Service Rules Relating to Working Forces for Operating Piers at Hoboken, N.J., and at Other Seaports	July 10, 1917
484	2660	Authorizing Appointment of Benajah D. Dyas as Stock Keeper in Competitive Classified Service in Government Printing Office	July 11, 1917
485	2661	Authorizing Appointment of George Simmons as Messenger Boy in Office of Chief of Naval Operations, Navy Department	July 11, 1917
486	2662	Authorizing Appointment of Mary C. Bryan to Position in Labor Department	July 11, 1917
487	2663	Suspending the Eight-Hour Act of June 19, 1912, Alaska Railroad No. 8	July 11, 1917
488	2664	Exercise of Authority Under the Emergency Shipping Fund Act	July 11, 1917
489	2665	Temporarily Withdrawing Certain Public Lands in New Mexico from Settlement Pending Determination of Title	July 17, 1917
490	2666	Authorizing Reinstatement of E. C. Yeats as Postal Clerk in Postal Service	July 17, 1917
491	2667	Setting Aside Certain Lands in Arizona for Use of Kaibab and Other Indians	July 17, 1917
492	2668	Authorizing Reinstatement of Walter W. Grose as Clerk in Quartermaster Corps of Army	July 17, 1917
493	2669	Granting Leave of Absence With Pay for Civil War Veterans to Attend Grand Army of the Republic Encampment	July 19, 1917
494	2670	Taking Over Lighthouses in Virgin Islands for Use and Purposes of United States	July 20, 1917
495	2671	Revoking Executive Order of October 17, 1916, Which Reserved Certain Lands in Arizona for Townsite Purposes	July 23, 1917
496	2672	Restoring to Entry and Settlement Certain Lands Reserved for Townsite Purposes by Executive Order of February 16, 1916	July 23, 1917
497	2673		July 28, 1917
498	2673-A	Explaining Exemption of Indispensable Government Employees From the Selective Draft	July 28, 1917
499	2674		July 30, 1917
500	2675		July 30, 1917
501	2676		July 31, 1917
502	2676-A		August 1, 1917
503	2677		August 3, 1917
504	2678		August 3, 1917
505	2679		August 3, 1917
506	2679-A	Establishment of the U.S. Food Administration	August 10, 1917
507	2680		August 13, 1917
508	2681	Authority to Organize Food Administration Grain Corporation	August 14, 1917
509	2682		August 16, 1917
510	2683		August 16, 1917
511	2684		August 16, 1917
512	2685		August 16, 1917
513	2686		August 21, 1917
514	2686-A	Fixing Provisional Prices for Bituminous Coal at the Mine	August 21, 1917
515	2687	Exercise of Authority Under the ‘‘Naval Emergency Fund Act,’’ and Others	August 21, 1917
516	2687-A	Establishing an Exports Administrative Board and an Exports Council	August 21, 1917
517	2688		August 23, 1917
518	2689		August 23, 1917
519	2690	Appointing Harry A. Garfield as Fuel Administrator	August 23, 1917
520	2690-A	Regulating Jobbers' Margins on Coal in Intrastate, Interstate, and Foreign Commerce of the United States	August 23, 1917
521	2691	Rules for the Government of the Virgin Islands	August 24, 1917
522	2692	Establishing Defensive Sea Areas for Terminal Ports of The Panama Canal, and Providing Regulations for the Government of Persons and Vessels Within Said Areas	August 27, 1917
523	2692-A	Former German Vessels, Leviathan, Mount Vernon, ...	August 29, 1917
524	2693		August 30, 1917
525	2694		August 30, 1917
526	2694-A	Authority to Exercise Powers Bestowed by Sections 15 and 16 of the Food Control Act	September 2, 1917
527	2695		September 6, 1917
528	2696	Executive Order Regarding Measurement of Foreign Ships Admitted to American Registry	September 7, 1917
529	2697	Regulations Relating to the Exportation of Coin, Bullion, and Currency	September 7, 1917
530	2698		September 7, 1917
531	2699		September 7, 1917
532	2700	Amending Civil Service Rules Pertaining to Positions Exempt from Examination	September 7, 1917
533	2701		September 7, 1917
534	2702		September 12, 1917
535	2703	Grace Matthews Trescot Made Eligible for Reinstatement for Government Service	September 12, 1917
536	2704	Modification of Military Camps to Conform With War Department Definition	September 17, 1917
537	2705	Suspending the Eight-Hour Day in the Bureau of Standards	September 20, 1917
538	2706	Authorizing Appointment of Mabel Money Kitchin Without Regard to Civil Service Rules	September 22, 1917
539	2707	Pertaining to Group Transfer of Personnel	September 24, 1917
540	2708	Creating Divisions of Pictures, Films and Publications under the Committee on Public Information	September 25, 1917
541	2709	Seizure of German Boats	September 27, 1917
542	2710	New Mexico, Restoration of Lands Withdrawn for Townsite Purposes by Executive Order No. 2459 of September 22, 1916	September 27, 1917
543	2711		September 27, 1917
544	2712	Amendment of Executive Order No. 1794 of July 3, 1913, and Executive Order of April 28, 1917	September 27, 1917
545	2713	Reserving Certain Lands in Montana for Administration of Beaverhead and Deerlodge National Forests	September 27, 1917
546	2714		September 27, 1917
547	2715	Authorizing Commerece Secretary to Appoint Employees Without Examination	September 27, 1917
548	2716	Authorizing Certain Food Administration Employees to be Appointed Without Examination	September 27, 1917
549	2717	Assigning Quarantine Duties in the Virgin Islands to the Treasury Department	September 27, 1917
550	2718	Suspending the Eight-Hour Day in Construction of Immigrant Station at Baltimore, Md.	September 27, 1917
551	2719	Authorizing Appointment of Frank H. Schloer Without Regard to Civil Service Rules	September 28, 1917
552	2720	Giving Chief of Staff Control over the War Department in the Absence of the Secretary of War and Assistant Secretary of War	September 29, 1917
553	2721	Amending Civil Service Rules Pertaining to Positions Exempt from Examination	October 3, 1917
554	2722	Authorizing Appointment of Lillian Schmidt Without Regard to Civil Service Rules	October 6, 1917
555	2723	Authorizing Appointment of Harry C. Bradley Without Regard to Civil Service Rules	October 6, 1917
556	2724		October 6, 1917
557	2725		October 6, 1917
558	2726	Colorado, Restoration of Lands Withdrawn by Executive Order No. 2466 of October 2, 1916	October 6, 1917
559	2727	Establishing Alaska Townsite and Railroad Withdrawal No. 16	October 8, 1917
560	2728	Establishing Alaska Townsite and Railroad Withdrawal No. 17	October 8, 1917
561	2729	Mabel E. Albertson Made Eligible for Appointment in Government Printing Office	October 9, 1917
562	2729-A	Vesting Power and Authority in Designated Officers and Making Rules and Regulations Under Trading With The Enemy Act and Title VII of the Act Approved June 15, 1917	October 12, 1917
563	2730	Ordering Free Consular Services for Duration of War	October 13, 1917
564	2731	Withdrawing Lands in Utah for Classification Pending Legislation for its Disposition	October 13, 1917
565	2732	Transferring Honolulu Buoy Depot, Oahu from War Department to Commerce Department	October 13, 1917
566	2733	Amending Civil Service Rules Pertaining to Positions Exempt from Examination	October 13, 1917
567	2734	Suspending Civil Service Rules in Training Camp Activities	October 15, 1917
568	2735	Reserving Huckleberry Island in Padilla Bay, Washington for Lighthouse Purposes	October 18, 1917
569	2736	Providing for Requisitioning of Foods and Feeds	October 23, 1917
570	2737	Correcting Executive Order No. 2692, Establishing Defensive Sea Areas for Terminal Ports of the Panama Canal	October 24, 1917
571	2738	Temporarily Withdrawing Two Islands in Straits of Juan de Fuca, Washington, to Determine Portion to be Reserved for Lighthouse Purposes	October 24, 1917
572	2739	Humboldt National Forest, Nevada	October 24, 1917
573	2740	Authorizing Certain Fuel Administration Employees to be Appointed Without Examination	October 25, 1917
574	2741	Waiving Civil Service Regulations for Confidential Positions under the Trading with the Enemy Act	October 25, 1917
575	2742	Amending Civil Service Rules to Allow War Department Production Experts in Signal Service to be Filled Upon Noncompetitive Examination	October 27, 1917
576	2743	Amending Civil Service Rules to Allow Army Transport Service Clerks to be Exempt from Examination	October 27, 1917
577	2743-A	Modifying the Scale of Prices of Bituminous Coal at the Mine	October 27, 1917
578	2744	Fixing Salary Of, And Vesting Certain Power And Authority In, The Alien Property Custodian Appointed Under Trading With The Enemy Act	October 29, 1917
579	2745	Authorizing Appointment of Virginia M. Spinks to Position in Department of Labor Without Regard to Civil Service Rules	November 1, 1917
580	2746	Authorizing Appointment of William P. Henshaw as Clerk in the Panama Canal Service Without Regard to Civil Service Rules	November 2, 1917
581	2747	Extending Trust Period on Allotments of Prairie Band of Pottawatomi Indians in Kansas	November 2, 1917
582	2748	Ordering Seizure of German Vessel Pollux by Shipping Board	November 2, 1917
583	2749	Reserving Certain Described Lands in Florida for Lighthouse Purposes	November 5, 1917
584	2750	Reserving Moro Rock, Redding Rock and Prince Island Off the Pacific Coast of California for Lighthouse Purposes	November 5, 1917
585	2751	Amendment of Executive Order No. 2707 of September 24, 1917	November 7, 1917
586	2752	Authorizing Reinstatement of Printers' Assistants and Operatives in Bureau of Engraving and Printing Without Regard to Eligibility Limit During War	November 9, 1917
587	2753	Amending Civil Service Rules in Regards to Transfers	November 10, 1917
588	2754	Exempting Food Administration and Fuel Administration from Civil Service Rules	November 10, 1917
589	2755	Reserving Blakely Rock, in Puget Sound, Washington for Lighthouse Purposes	November 14, 1917
590	2755-A		November 22, 1917
591	2756	Authorizing Appointment Without Examination for Secretaries of Explosives Inspectors	November 22, 1917
592	2757	Reserving Certain Lands in Alaska for Use of Bureau of Education and Indigenous Natives	November 22, 1917
593	2758	Amending Civil Service Rules in Regards to Messenger Girls	November 22, 1917
594	2759	Reserving Sister Islands in Green Bay, Wisconsin for Lighthouse Purposes	November 22, 1917
595	2760	Returning William V. Hagar to Service in the United States Coast and Geodetic Survey	November 23, 1917
596	2761	Authorizing Interior Secretary to Appoint Persons in the Mine Bureau Without Regard to Civil Service Rules	November 23, 1917
597	2762	Restricting Transfer of Government Employees During War	November 24, 1917
598	2763	Authorizing Aeronautic Draftsmen in the Navy Department to be Filled upon Noncompetitive Examination	November 24, 1917
599	2764	Modifying Boundaries of Harney National Forest to Exclude Certain Lands in South Dakota	November 26, 1917
600	2765	Determination of a Just, Fair, and Reasonable Profit Under Section 5 of the Food Control Act	November 27, 1917
601	2765-A		November 30, 1917
602	2766	Authorizing Appointment of Temporary Carriers on Rural Routes Without Regard to Civil Service Rules	December 1, 1917
603	2767	Amending Civil Service Rules Relating to Interior Department	December 5, 1917
604	2768	Amending Civil Service Rules Relating to Employees of Army Ordnance Department in Canada	December 5, 1917
605	2769	Suspending the Eight-Hour Day in Construction of Buildings on Fourteenth Street NW., Washington, D. C.	December 6, 1917
606	2770	Supplemental to Executive Order of October 12, 1917, Vesting Power and Authority in Designated Officers and Making Rules and Regulations Under Trading With the Enemy Act and Title VII of the Act Approved June 15, 1917	December 7, 1917
607	2771	Returning Aaron L. Shalowitz to Service in Department of Commerce	December 8, 1917
608	2772	Temporarily Reserving Certain Lands in New Mexico for Military Purposes	December 12, 1917
609	2773	Eliminating Certain Lands from Executive Orders Nos. 1 and 2 of Alaska Townslte Withdrawals, Dated April 21 and June 23, 1914, Withdrawing Certain Lands for Townslte and Railroad Purposes	December 12, 1917
610	2774	Authorizing Appointment of O. C. Husting to Appropriate Position in Competitive Classified Service Without Examination	December 17, 1917
611	2774-A	Creating Division of Foreign Picture Service Under Committee on Public Information	December 17, 1917
612	2775	Modifying Executive Order of September 24, 1917, So as to Strike Name of John T. Watkins from List of Coast and Geodetic Survey Officers Therein Named to Serve with War Department and Add It to List of Those Named to Serve With Navy Department; (Dec. 19)	December 19, 1917
613	2776	Authorizing Appointment of Frederick S. Taylor to Subclerical Position in Classified Service of Treasury Department; (Dec. 26)	December 26, 1917
614	2777	Prescribing Rules Regarding Repeals, Alterations and Amendments of Local Laws and Expenditure of Duties and Taxes in Virgin Islands	December 26, 1917
615	2778	Indians, Extension of Trust Period on Allotments	December 31, 1917

=== 1918 ===
Relative No.	Absolute No.	Title/Description	Date signed
616	2779	Amending Executive Order of August 11, 1916, Concerning Rations of Enlisted Men of Army, Navy, and Marine Corps under Treatment or On Duty at Army and Navy General Hospital, Hot Springs, Arkansas	January 3, 1918
617	2780	Amendment to Civil Service Rules Relating to Commerce Department by Striking Out Paragraph Concerning Shipping Commissioners	January 7, 1918
618	2781	Authorizing Transfer of Charles W. Olvey from Skilled Laborer to Clerkship in Office of Secretary of Commerce	January 8, 1918
619	2782	Ordering Certain Persons Who Were Transferred to Service and Jurisdiction of War Department by Executive Order of September 24, 1917, be Returned to Their Former Status in Coast and Geodetic Survey	January 9, 1918
620	2783	Amending Civil Service Rules Relating to Classified Positions Excepted from Examination That Can Not be Filled from Registers of Eliglbles by Rescinding Portion of Rule Relating to Revenue-Cutter Service	January 10, 1918
621	2784	Amending Civil Service Rules Relating to War Department So as to Except from Examination All Persons Employed by Quartermaster Corps of Army in Connection With Prosecution of Construction Work	January 10, 1918
622	2785	Amending Civil Service Rules Relating to War Department by Revoking Executive Order of January 10, 1918, Concerning Persons Employed by Quartermaster Corps of Army in Connection with Prosecution of Construction Work	January 15, 1918
623	2786	Authorizing Secretary of Treasury, During Continuance of Present War, to Make Appointments to Various Positions in Bureau of Engraving and Printing Without Regard to Requirements of Civil Service Commission	January 15, 1918
624	2789	Military Reservation for the National Guard	January 19, 1918
625	2790	Allotting Appropriation Under Trading With the Enemy Act	January 22, 1918
626	2796	Prescribing Rules and Regulations Under Section 5 of the Trading with the Enemy Act and Supplementing Rules and Regulations Heretofore Prescribed Under Title 7 of the Espionage Act	January 26, 1918
627	2801	Amending Executive Order Dated October 12, 1917	February 5, 1918
628	2809	Certain Described Lands in Utah Reserved for the Use of Certain Skull Valley, and Other Indians	
629	2813	Prescribing Rules and Regulations Respecting the Exercise of the Powers and Authority and the Performance of the Duties of the Alien Property Custodian	February 26, 1918
630	2819	Amending Executive Order No. 1572 of February 14, 1912, to Include Federal Employees Residing in Laurel, Md.	March 9, 1918
631	2820		March 15, 1918
632	2820-A		March 18, 1918
633	2821		March 19, 1918
634	2822		March 19, 1918
635	2822-A		March 19, 1918
636	2823		March 20, 1918
637	2823-A		March 21, 1918
638	2824		March 23, 1918
639	2825	Certain Described Lands Granted to the United States by the Republic of Panama in the Treaty of February 26, 1904, Reserved for Military Purposes	March 25, 1918
640	2825-A	Executive Order Taking Possession of Equipment on Board Netherlands Vessels	March 28, 1918
641	2826		March 29, 1918
642	2832	Concerning Certain Sales to be Conducted by the Alien Property Custodian Pursuant to the ‘‘Trading with the Enemy Act’’ and Amendments Thereof	April 2, 1918
643	2837	Revoking Power and Authority in Designated Offices Under the Trading With the Enemy Act	April 11, 1918
644	2843	Concerning a Sale to be Conducted by the Alien Property Custodian Pursuant to the ‘‘Trading with the Enemy Act’’ and Amendments Thereof	April 24, 1918
645	2844	Concerning a Sale to be Conducted by the Alien Property Custodian Pursuant to the ‘‘Trading with the Enemy Act’’ and Amendments Thereof	April 24, 1918
646	2845	Concerning a Sale to be Conducted by the Alien Property Custodian Pursuant to the ‘‘Trading with the Enemy Act’’ and Amendments Thereof	April 24, 1918
647	2846	Concerning a Sale to be Conducted by the Alien Property Custodian Pursuant to the ‘‘Trading with the Enemy Act’’ and Amendments Thereof	April 24, 1918
648	2847	Concerning a Sale to be Conducted by the Alien Property Custodian Pursuant to the ‘‘Trading with the Enemy Act’’ and Amendments Thereof	April 24, 1918
649	2857	Concerning a Sale to be Conducted by the Alien Property Custodian Pursuant to the ‘‘Trading with the Enemy Act’’ and Amendments Thereof	May 7, 1918
650	2858	Concerning a Sale to be Conducted by the Alien Property Custodian Pursuant to the ‘‘Trading with the Enemy Act’’ and Amendments Thereof	May 9, 1918
651	2859	National Research Council of the National Academy of Sciences	May 11, 1918
652	2859-A	Directing the Shipping Board to Take Control of Austria-Hungarian Vessel Martha Washington	May 11, 1918
653	2860	Authorizing the Eligibility for Promotion of Joseph H. Mills	May 14, 1918
654	2861	Vessels Explorer and Batterson Transferred from the Coast and Geodetic Survey to the Navy Department	May 16, 1918
655	2862	Creation of Bureau of Aircraft Production	May 20, 1918
656	2863		May 20, 1918
657	2863-A		May 21, 1918
658	2864		May 24, 1918
659	2869	Order of Withdrawal of Certain Public Lands for Military Purposes; Panama Canal Zone	May 28, 1918
660	2877	Ordering Most Law Officers of the Government Shall Exercise their Functions Under the Supervision and Control of the Head of the Department of Justice	May 31, 1918
661	2882	Leave for the Spanish War Veterans to Attend Reunion	June 13, 1918
662	2282-A		June 13, 1918
663	2883		June 14, 1918
664	2284		June 21, 1918
665	2885	With Respect to Orenstein and Koppel-Arthur Koppel Actiengesellschaft Commonly Known as Orenstein-Koppel Company	June 15, 1918
666	2889	Delegating War Housing Functions to the Secretary of Labor	June 18, 1918
667	2890	Leave for Grand Army Men to Attend Reunion	June 21, 1918
668	2899	Directing All Sanitary or Public Health Activities of Certain Executive Agencies be Exercised Under Control of Public Health Service	July 1, 1918
669	2900	Order of Withdrawal of Certain Public Lands for Military Purposes; Oahu, Territory of Hawaii	July 2, 1918
670	2903	Transferring a Portion of the Coal Section of the Federal Trade Commission to the United States Fuel Administration	July 3, 1918
671	2907	Superseding Executive Order of May 18, 1918, Authorizing Governor of Panama Canal Zone to Exercise Authority of Espionage Act	July 9, 1918
672	2907-A		July 9, 1918
673	2908		July 10, 1918
674	2914	Concerning Certain Sales to be Conducted by the Alien Property Custodian Pursuant to the "Trading With the Enemy Act" And Amendments Thereof	July 15, 1918
675	2916	Prescribing Additional Rules and Regulations, and Making Certain Determinations Respecting the Exercise of the Powers and Authority and the Performance of the Duties of the Alien Property Custodian	July 16, 1918
676	2917	Extension of Civil Service Reinstatement Time to Service Men	July 18, 1918
677	2918	Allowing More than Eight Hours of Labor in a Day for Work Relating to War Housing Needs	July 18, 1918
678	2926	Executive Order Amending Paragraph 20 of the Navigation Rules and Regulations of the Panama Canal	July 26, 1918
679	2929	Authorizing the United States Fuel Administrator to Prepare and Adopt Specifications for the Supply of Petroleum and Its Products Through a Committee on Standardization of Petroleum Specifications	July 31, 1918
680	2932	Prescribing Rules and Regulations Governing the Issuance of Permits to Enter and Leave the United States	August 8, 1918
681	2934		August 13, 1918
682	2934-A		August 13, 1918
683	2935		August 14, 1918
684	2940	Vesting Power and Authority in Designated Officers and Making Rules and Regulations Under Trading With The Enemy Act and Title VII of the Act Approved June 15, 1917	August 20, 1918
685	2949	Concerning Certain Sales to be Conducted by the Alien Property Custodian Pursuant to the "Trading With the Enemy Act" and Amendments Thereof	August 29, 1918
686	2951	Authorizing Reinstatement of Wilmot H. MacDonald in Classified Service	September 4, 1918
687	2952	Rescinding Executive Order Issued July 15, 1918	September 6, 1918
688	2953	Authorizing the Alien Property Custodian to Sell Certain Property at Private Sale	September 12, 1918
689	2954	Cancelling Sale of Froehlich and Kuttner Made to Compania Mercantil de Filipinas by the Alien Property Custodian's Representative Pursuant to the “Trading with the Enemy Act” and Amendments Thereof	September 13, 1918
690	2955	Cancelling Sale of Part of Germann & Company, Ltd., Inc., Made to the Oxy-Acetylene Welding & Cutting Company, Changed to Philippine Engineering Company, Inc., by the Alien Property Custodian's Representative Pursuant to the "Trading with the Enemy Act" and Amendments Thereof	September 13, 1918
691	2956	Cancelling Sale of Part of A. Richter & Company, Known as "El Siglo" Made to Lorza & Lozano, by the Alien Property Custodian's Representative Pursuant to the "Trading with the Enemy Act" and Amendments Thereof	September 13, 1918
692	2957	Cancelling Sale of Part of A. Richter & Company, Known as ‘‘La Sombreria” Made to E. P. Brias y Roxas, by the Alien Property Custodian's Representative Pursuant to the “Trading with the Enemy Act’’ and Amendments Thereof	September 13, 1918
693	2958	Cancelling Sale of "Helios" Cigar Factory, Part of Germann & Company, Inc., Made to Walter E. Olsen and Company, by the Alien Property Custodian's Representative, Pursuant to the "Trading with the Enemy Act" and Amendments Thereof	September 13, 1918
694	2959	Vesting Power and Authority in a Designated Official or His Successors in Office, Subject to the Supervision of the Alien Property Custodian	September 13, 1918
695	2964		September 16, 1918
696	2964-A		September 19, 1918
697	2965		September 20, 1918
698	2968	Rejecting the Bid of Theodore Friedeburg of $145,000 for the Property of The Partnership of A. W. Faber, Offered for Sale at Public Auction on September 17, 1918, Pursuant to the ‘‘Trading with the Enemy Act’’ and Amendments Thereof	September 30, 1918
699	2968-A	Providing for the Censorship of Foreign Mails in the Panama Canal Zone	March 10, 1918
700	2969		October 7, 1918
701	2970		October 8, 1918
702	2971	Providing for the Licensing of Chauffeurs in Canal Zone	October 9, 1918
703	2979		October 22, 1918
704	2979-A		October 22, 1918
705	2980		October 24, 1918
706	2984		October 25, 1918
707	2984-A		October 25, 1918
708	2985		October 28, 1918
709	2985-A		October 29, 1918
710	2986		November 1, 1918
711	2987	Placing Certain Land and Water Areas Under the Control of the Secretary of Navy for Use as a Naval Air Station	November 4, 1918
712	2991	Prescribing Additional Rules and Regulations, And Making Certain Determinations Respecting the Exercise of the Powers and Authority and the Performance of the Duties of the Alien Property Custodian	November 12, 1918
713	2993	Authorizing the Granting of Sick Leave to Alien Employees in Panama Canal and Panama Railroad Service	November 14, 1918
714	2996	Amending Civil Service Rules Regarding Clerical Positions on the Isthmus of Panama	November 16, 1918
715	3008	Exemption of Persons Certified as Loyal by Attorney General from Classification as Enemy Aliens Authorized for Naturalization Purposes	November 26, 1918
716	3009	Sevier National Forest, Utah, Diminished	November 27, 1918
717	3010	Battlement National Forest, Colorado	November 27, 1918
718	3010-A		November 27, 1918
719	3011	Authorizing Reappointment to Competitive Classified Service of Certain Persons Separated from Service by Reduction of Force	November 29, 1918
720	3012		November 29, 1918
721	3013		November 30, 1918
722	3014		November 30, 1918
723	3015		December 2, 1918
724	3016	Vesting Certain Powers Under the Trading-With-the-Enemy Act In Property Custodian and Frank L. Polk	December 3, 1918
725	3016-A	Authorizing Alien Property Custodian to Reject All Bids for 2000 Shares of Capital Stock of International Insurance Co. of New York	December 3, 1918
726	3017		December 3, 1918
727	3018		December 3, 1918
728	3019		December 3, 1918
729	3019-A		December 31, 1918
730	3019-B		December 30, 1918

=== 1919 ===
Relative No.	Absolute No.	Title/Description	Date signed
731	3020	Erroneously Allowed Entry in Former Fort Peck Indian Reservation, Montana, Ordered Confirmed in Accordance With Proclamation No. 1361 of March 21, 1917	January 1, 1919
732	3021		January 7, 1919
733	3016-B	Authorizing the Alien Property Custodian to Transfer to Henry Schniewind, Jr., of New York, N.Y., All Rights in Susquehanna Silk Mills, the Property of H.E. Schniewind, Sr., Willy Schniewind, and Hans Schniewind of Elberfield Germany	January 11, 1919
734	3022		January 11, 1919
735	3023		January 11, 1919
736	3024		January 11, 1919
737	3024-A		January 17, 1919
738	3024-B		January 21, 1919
739	3024-C		January 16, 1919
740	3025		January 25, 1919
741	3026		January 25, 1919
742	3027	Revoking Executive Orders Establishing Defensive Sea Areas	January 25, 1919
743	3028	..., to Coast and Geodetic Survey	January 25, 1919
744	3029	Retransfer of Certain Named Individuals from War Department to Coast and Geodetic Survey	January 25, 1919
745	3030	Revoking Executive Order of ..., Regarding Submarine Cables and Telegraph and Telephone Lines	January 25, 1919
746	3031	Leave Due Canal Zone Employees Returning from Military or Naval Service	January 25, 1919
747	3032	Revoking Executive Order of April 9, 1917, Placing Control of the Panama Canal and the Canal Zone Under Army Control	January 25, 1919
748	3033	..., Alaska	February 5, 1919
749	3035	Amending Civil Service Rules Relating to Reinstatement	February 7, 1919
750	3035-A		February 14, 1919
751	3035-B	Appointing Herbert Hoover as Director General of American Relief Administration	February 24, 1919
752	3042		February 25, 1919
753	3016-C	Authorizing the Alien Property Custodian to Sell Certain Trademark and Patent Rights of Enemy Alien Firms to the Chemical Foundation, Inc., Delaware	February 26, 1919
754	3043	Diminishment of Cabinet National Forest, Montana Mexico; Excluded Lands Reserved for Townsite Purposes	February 26, 1919
755	3044	Return of Certain Vessels, Equipment and Personnel ...	February 26, 1919
756	3045	Clara Bell Suit, Exemption From Civil Service Rules on Appointment	February 26, 1919
757	3046	Authorizing Industrial Board within Commerce Department to Employ Qualified Personnel Without Regard to Civil Service Rules	February 26, 1919
758	3049	Amendment of Executive Order No. 2903 of July 3, 1918, Returning Materials Pertaining to the Coal Industry to the Federal Trade Commission from the Fuel Administration	February 27, 1919
759	3050	Individual, Exemption From Civil Service Rules on Appointment	February 27, 1919
760	3051	Miss Bert M. Williams, Exemption From Civil Service Rules on Appointment	February 27, 1919
761	3052	Revoking Executive Order Nos. 3000 and 3006 of Nov 18 and 26, 1918, Respectively, Establishing Liquor Control Zones in Tenn. & Pa.	February 28, 1919
762	3053	Montana, Temporary Withdrawal of Certain Described Lands Pending Legislation	February 28, 1919
763	3053-A		February 28, 1919
764	3054	Rescinding Executive Order of April 2, 1917, Requiring Assent of Head of Department for Civil Service Examination	March 2, 1919
765	3055	Extending Withdrawal of Certain Lands in Idaho by Proclamation No. 1397 of October 9, 1917, Pending Legislation	March 3, 1919
766	3056	... Restored to the Government of the Philippines	March 3, 1919
767	3057	Authorizing Appointment of Charles Aurthur Richards as A Member for Additional Representation of the Food Administrator on the War Trade Board	March 3, 1919
768	3058		March 3, 1919
769	3059	Ordering Chairman of War Trade Board the Transfer of Functions and Records of Said Board to State Department	March 3, 1919
770	3060	Prescribing Regulations for Sale of Lots Within Girdwood Townsite	March 3, 1919
771	3060-A		March 3, 1919
772	3016-D	Authorizing the Alien Property Custodian to Reject All Bids for Specified Capital Stock and Property of the Golde Patent Manufacturing Company	March 4, 1919
773	3016-E	Authorizing the Alien Property Custodian to Reject All Bids for Specified Common Capital Stock of New Brunswick Chemical Company, a New Jersey Corporation.	March 4, 1919
774	3061	California, Creation of Laguna Mountain Administrative Site for Use as a Ranger Station in the Administration of Cleveland National Forest	March 4, 1919
775	3062	Form of Panama Canal Tonnage Certificates Amended	March 4, 1919
776	3063	Certain Powers of the Shipping Board Emergency Fleet Corporation Pertaining to Emergency Shipping Fund Withdrawn and Delegated to ...	March 13, 1919
777	3064	Certain Powers of the Shipping Board Pertaining to Emergency Shipping Fund and Delegated to War Secretary	March 12, 1919
778	3016-F	Authorizing the Alien Property Custodian to Reject All Bids for Certain Capital Stock and Certain Other Properties of Gerhard and Hey, Inc.	March 13, 1919
779	3016-G	Authorizing the Alien Property Custodian to Reject All Bids for Specified Stock of Hayden Chemical Works, All Rights Granted to the Chemische Fabrik von Hayden A.G., Radebeul, Germany, by the Said Chemical Works, and for Certain Patents and Trademarks held by Chemische Fabrik van Hayden A.G. and Fr. von Hayden Nachfolger, Radebuel, Germany	March 14, 1919
780	3016-H	Authorizing the Alien Property Custodian to Reject All Bids for Certain Property of International Textile Company, Inc.	March 15, 1919
781	3065	Amending Regulations Governing Appointments and Promotions in the Diplomatic Service	March 15, 1919
782	3066	Abolishing the Aircraft Board	March 19, 1919
783	3016-I	Authorizing the Alien Property Custodian to Transfer to the American Radio Company All Rights and Property of Rudolph Goldschmidt and of the Hochfrequenz-Maschienen Aktiongeseschaft for Drahtlose Telegraphie	March 24, 1919
784	3016-J	Authorizing the Alien Property Custodian to Sell at Private Sale All Rights and Patents of the Schmidt-sche Heissdampf Gesellschaft, of Germany to the Locomotive Superheater Co.	March 24, 1919
785	3067	Executive Order No. 2978 of October 21, 1918, Withdrawing Certain Lands Adjacent to Fort De Rusey, Kalia, Oahu, T.H., Revoked	March 25, 1919
786	3068		March 25, 1919
787	3069	Individual, Exemption From Civil Service Rules on Reinstatement	March 25, 1919
788	3016-K	Authorizing the Alien Property Custodian to Sell at Private Sale Certain Patent and Trademark Rights of Enemy Aliens to the Chemical Foundation, Inc.	April 5, 1919
789	3016-L	Authorizing the Alien Property Custodian to Reject All Bids for Specified Shares of Capital Stock of K. & E. Neumond, Inc., New Orleans, Louisiana	April 5, 1919
790	3016-M	Authorizing the Alien Property Custodian to Reject All Bids for Specified Capital Stock of the Dr. Jaeger's Sanitary Woolen System Co. and Certain Trademarks	April 8, 1919
791	3070	Restoring Certain Described Lands Reserved by Executive Order No. 2900 of July 2, 1918, for Military Purposes to the Government of Territory of Hawaii	April 8, 1919
792	3071		April 8, 1919
793	3074	Amending Civil Service Rules Relating to Qualification of Applicants	April 16, 1919
794	3075	Amending Civil Service Rules Relating to Reinstatement, and Revoking Executive Orders of July 18, 1918, and February 7, 1919	April 16, 1919
795	3076		April 16, 1919
796	3077		April 16, 1919
797	3016-N		April 18, 1919
798	3078		April 22, 1919
799	3085		May 4, 1919
800	3016-O		May 7, 1919
801	3086		May 11, 1919
802	3086-A		May 12, 1919
803	3086-B		May 12, 1919
804	3087		May 14, 1919
805	3087-A		May 14, 1919
806	3088		May 17, 1919
807	3091	Authorizing Secretary of Navy to Transfer Certain Vessels to Other Executive Departments	May 24, 1919
808	3016-P		May 28, 1919
809	3016-Q		May 28, 1919
810	3016-R		May 28, 1919
811	3092		May 31, 1919
812	3093	Authorizing Reinstatement of Frank H. Wang as a Postal Clerk at the Panama Canal	May 31, 1919
813	3094		May 31, 1919
814	3094-A		June 5, 1919
815	3094-B		June 7, 1919
816	3095		June 8, 1919
817	3016-S		June 10, 1919
818	3096		June 12, 1919
819	3097	Amending Consular Regulations of 1896 Concerning Payment of Wages at Ports	June 17, 1919
820	3016-T		June 18, 1919
821	3016-U		June 18, 1919
822	3098		June 19, 1919
823	3099		June 23, 1919
824	3016-V		June 24, 1919
825	3099-A		June 24, 1919
826	3100		June 25, 1919
827	3108		June 30, 1919
828	3016-W		July 8, 1919
829	3016-X		July 8, 1919
830	3109		July 10, 1919
831	3110		July 10, 1919
832	3111		July 10, 1919
833	3111-A		July 11, 1919
834	3112		July 12, 1919
835	3113	Vesting in Attorney General all Power and Authority Conferred upon the President by Section 9 of the Trading with the Enemy Act	July 15, 1919
836	3126	Transferring Records of War Industries Board to Council of National Defense	July 22, 1919
837	3130	Setting Apart Certain Land in Canal Zone for use as Fort Amador and Fort Grant Military Reservations	July 25, 1919
838	3142	Suspending Provisions of Law Requiring Inspection of Foreign-Built Ships for Eighteen Months	August 8, 1919
839	3154	Dissolving Committee on Public Information and Transferring Assets to Council of National Defense	August 21, 1919
840	3158		August 27, 1919
841	3159	Directing General Supply Committee of Treasury Department to Maintain Records of Surplus Material for Use by Government Agencies	August 27, 1919
842	3172	Annulling Orders of Fuel Administration in Order to Restore Bituminous Coal Regulations	October 30, 1919
843	3176	Authorizing Title of All German Vessels Seized During War to be Taken Over in Accordance with Joint Resolution	November 24, 1919
844	3182	Amending Section 3 of the Executive Order of February 2, 1914, Providing Conditions of Employment for the Permanent Force for the Panama Canal	November 25, 1919
845	3188	Oregon, Land Withdrawal for Classification and Pending Legislation	December 2, 1919
846	3189	Related to Cited Executive Order No. 2593 of April 13, 1917	December 2, 1919
847	3190		December 2, 1919
848	3191		December 2, 1919
849	3192	Restoring Certain Described Lands Reserved by Executive Order of November 4, 1885, for the Improvement of the Columbia River	December 2, 1919
850	3193	Restoring Certain Described Lands Formerly Reserved by Executive Order No. 2581 of April 4, 1917, to the Government of the Territory of Hawaii	December 2, 1919
851	3202	Setting Aside Certain Land in Canal Zone for Use as Quarry Heights Military Reservation	December 22, 1919
852	3203	Setting Aside Certain Land in Canal Zone for Use as Fort William D. Davie Military Reservation	December 22, 1919
853	3207	Setting Aside Certain Land in Canal Zone for Use as Military Reservation	December 30, 1919

=== 1920 ===
Relative No.	Absolute No.	Title/Description	Date signed
854	3208		January 2, 1920
855	3210	Establishing Regulations for the Canal Zone Relative to the Sale, Possession, and Disposition of Liquors For Sacramental, Scientific, Industrial, Pharmaceutical, and Medicinal Purposes	January 7, 1920
856	3211	Requiring Executive Departments to Furnish Information to Bituminous Coal Commission	January 8, 1920
857	3213	Concerning Costs and Security for Costs in the District Court and the Magistrates' Courts in the Panama Canal Zone	January 9, 1920
858	3222	Applying Executive Order No. 3091 of May 24, 1919, to the Panama Canal	February 3, 1920
859	3226	Authorizing Charges for Services Rendered by the Quarantine Division of The Panama Canal	February 11, 1920
860	3232	Establishing a Maximum Rate of Pay for Alien Employees of The Panama Canal and the Panama Railroad Company on the Isthmus of Panama	February 20, 1920
861	3237	Reserving Certain Lands of the Punta Mala Lighthouse for Use as Naval Radio Station	March 1, 1920
862	3243	Carrying and Keeping of Arms in the Canal Zone	March 6, 1920
863	3247	Restoring Rules and Regulations of Fuel Administration	March 19, 1920
864	3249	Dissolving the United States Bituminous Coal Commission	March 24, 1920
865	3255	Establishing Maritime Quarantine Regulations for the Canal Zone and Harbors of the Cities of Panama and Colon, Republic of Panama	March 31, 1920
866	3257	Reserving Certain Lands in the Canal Zone for Fort Randolph and France Field Military Reservations, and Coco Solo Naval Reservation	April 9, 1920
867	3268	Transferring Records of War Labor Board to Council of National Defense	May 5, 1920
868	3278-A	Regulations Regarding Reinstatement of Former Employees Nearing Retirement Age	June 2, 1920
869	3283	Suspending Provision 3 of Executive Order of March 24, 1920, until Conclusion of Work of Anthracite Coal Commission	June 16, 1920
870	3297	Temporarily Withdrawing Land in South Dakota for Determination of Availability for Permanent Reservation	June 30, 1920
871	3308	Temporarily Withdrawing Land in South Dakota to Protect Water Supply of Wind Cave National Park	July 14, 1920
872	3313	Amending Consular Regulations Concerning Payment of Wages	July 21, 1920
873	3314	Temporarily Withdrawing Land in Arizona to Determine Advisability for Inclusion in Tumacacori National Monument	July 26, 1920
874	3317	Holy Cross-Sopris National Forest, Colorado	August 7, 1920
875	3322	Paitilla Point Military Reservation	September 1, 1920
876	3332	Authorizing Retention for Certain Period of Certain Hoboken Piers by War Department	October 2, 1920
877	3345	Temporarily Withdrawing Land in Arizona for Examination of Ruins and Hieroglyphics	October 20, 1920
878	3347	Licensing of Chauffeurs in the Canal Zone	October 30, 1920
879	3352	Expanding the Fort Sherman Military Reservation in the Canal Zone	November 6, 1920
880	3358	In General Relates to Marginal Wharf Area to Sand Island Military Reservation, Territory of Hawaii	November 24, 1920
881	3359		November 25, 1920
882	3360	Prescribing Design and Dimensions for an Official Flag for the Office of Secretary of State	November 28, 1920
883	3361	Constance Kerschner, Exemption From Civil Service Rules on Appointment	November 30, 1920
884	3362	Extension of Trust Period on Allotments Made to Indians of the Crow Creek Reservation, South Dakota	November 30, 1920
885	3363	Extension of Trust Period on Allotments Made to Ponca Indians of Oklahoma	December 1, 1920
886	3364	Diminishment of Some Military Reservation	December 1, 1920
887	3365	Extension of Trust or Other Period of Restriction Against Alienation Contained in Any Patent Issued to Any Indian for Lands on the Public Domain	December 7, 1920
888	3366	Diminishment of Alaska Townsite and Railroad Withdrawal [No. 2] and Such Lands Opened to Entry	December 8, 1920
889	3367	Prescribing Army Regulations Governing Maximum Limits of Punishment	December 10, 1920
890	3368	Natalie Summers, Exemption From Civil Service Rules on Appointment	December 11, 1920
891	3369		December 11, 1920
892	3370		December 16, 1920
893	3371		December 17, 1920
894	3372		December 21, 1920
895	3373		December 22, 1920
896	3374	Somehow Related to Executive Order No. 2903 of July 3, 1918	December 22, 1920
897	3375		December 24, 1920
898	3376	Amendment to Civil Service Rules, Schedule A, Subdivision III, Paragraph 7	December 24, 1920
899	3377	Somehow Related to Executive Order No. 2738 of October 24, 1917	December 24, 1920
900	3378	Ernest D. Pickell, Exemption From Civil Service Rules on Appointment	December 26, 1920
901	3379	Transfer of Certain Described Lands from Chelan National Forest to Wenatchee National Forest, Washington	December 31, 1920
902	3380	Modifying Boundaries of Chelan and Wenatchee National Forests, Washington, to Reflect Intertransfer of Lands	December 31, 1920

=== 1921 ===
Relative No.	Absolute No.	Title/Description	Date signed
903	3381	Vancouver or Columbia River Land District, Washington, Abolished and Lands, Business, and Archives Thereof Transferred to the Olympia Land District	January 4, 1921
904	3382	Amendment of Executive Order of April 16, 1914, So as to Include Mints and Assay Offices and Federal Reserve Banks to Which the Duties and Functions of Assistant Treasurers of the United States are Transferred by the Secretary of the Treasury Under the Act of May 29, 1920	January 5, 1921
905	3383	Extension of Trust Period on Allotments Made to Indians of the ... and Sycuan Mission Reservations, California	January 7, 1921
906	3384	Alaska, Certain Lands Withdrawn for Use As Agricultural Experiment Stations Restored and Returned to Public Domain	January 12, 1921
907	3385		January 12, 1921
908	3386		January 21, 1921
909	3387		January 22, 1921
910	3388	Order of Withdrawal of Certain Public Lands for Municipal Purposes; Phoenix, Arizona	January 22, 1921
911	3398	Prescribing the Transfer of Certain Records to the Public Health Service	January 24, 1921
912	3390	Abolishment of Portland, Oregon as a Port of Entry in Customs Collection District No. 29 and Prescribing new Limits for Establishing New Port of Entry	January 24, 1921
913	3391		January 27, 1921
914	3392	Emma V. Morgan, Exemption from Civil Service Rules on Appointment	January 28, 1921
915	3393		January 28, 1921
916	3394	Withdrawing Land in Wyoming for Classification and Pending Legislation for its Disposition	January 28, 1921
917	3395	Withdrawing Land in California for Classification and Pending Legislation for its Disposition	January 28, 1921
918	3396	Relates to Some Action Concerning Railway Labor Board	January 29, 1921
919	3397		January 31, 1921
920	3398	Amendment to Civil Service Rules, Schedule A, Subdivision III, Paragraph 9	February 2, 1921
921	3399	Individual, Exemption from Civil Service Rules on Appointment	February 2, 1921
922	3400	Amendment to Civil Service Rules, Schedule A, Subdivision III, Paragraph 7	February 3, 1921
923	3401	Arthur Byrd, Exemption from Civil Service Rules on Appointment	February 10, 1921
924	3402	New Mexico, Land Withdrawal for ...	February 11, 1921
925	3403	Excusing Federal Per Diem Employees and Day Laborers in the District of Columbia from Work on Inauguration Day, March 4, 1921	February 12, 1921
926	3404	Alaska, Certain Lands Withdrawn for Use in Warm Springs Bay Lighthouse Reserve	February 12, 1921
927	3405	Reserving Sheep Administrative Site, Arizona, for Use in the Administration of Prescott National Forest	February 12, 1921
928	3406		February 13, 1921
929	3407		February 15, 1921
930	3408	Authorizing the Creation of the ... Housing Corporation of Pennsylvania by the Secretary of Labor	February 16, 1921
931	3409	Margaret Reardon and Joeseph F. Murphy, Exemption from Civil Service Rules on Appointment	February 18, 1921
932	3410	Wyoming, Certain Described Lands Previously Withdrawn for Powersite Purposes Further Reserved for Classification and Pending Legislation for Possible Inclusion in Shoshone National Forest	February 22, 1921
933	3411	Idaho, Certain Described Lands Withdrawn for Classification and Pending Legislation for Possible Inclusion in Minidoka National Forest	February 22, 1921
934	3412		February 25, 1921
935	3413	Diminishment of Shasta National Forest, California, and Such Lands Opened to Entry Limited to Certain Individuals	February 27, 1921
936	3414	Excluding Certain Employees in Reclamation Service from Provisions of Civil Service Retirement Act	March 1, 1921
937	3415	Half-Mast Flag Display Ordered on March 5, 1921, at Washington, D. C., and March 7, 1921, at Bowling Green, Mo., for Services for the Late Champ Clark, Former Speaker of the House of Representatives	March 3, 1921

== Presidential proclamations ==
=== 1913 ===
Relative No.	Absolute No.	Title/Description	Date signed
1	1237	Convening Extra Session of Congress	March 17, 1913
2	1258	Rules for the Measurement of Vessels for the Panama Canal	November 21, 1913

=== 1914 ===
Relative No.	Absolute No.	Title/Description	Date signed
3	1268	Mother's Day Proclamation, 1914	May 9, 1914
4	1287	Declaring Rules for Maintenance of Neutrality of Panama Canal and Panama Canal Zone	November 13, 1914

=== 1915 ===
Relative No.	Absolute No.	Title/Description	Date signed
5	1318	Setting Aside the Walnut Canyon National Monument, Ariz.	November 30, 1915

=== 1916 ===
Relative No.	Absolute No.	Title/Description	Date signed
6	1340	Setting Aside the Capulin Mountain National Monument, N. Mex.	August 9, 1916

=== 1917 ===
Relative No.	Absolute No.	Title/Description	Date signed
7	1364	Declaring that a State of War Exists Between the United States and Germany	April 6, 1917
8	1370	Designating June 1, 1917, as Registration Day, Etc.	May 18, 1917
9	1371	Declaring Rules for Maintenance of Neutrality of Panama Canal and Panama Canal Zone	May 23, 1917

=== 1918 ===
Relative No.	Absolute No.	Title/Description	Date signed
10	1423	Setting Apart the Alabama National Forest Alabama	January 15, 1918
11	1480	Designating September 12, 1918, as Registration Day for Persons Between the Ages of Eighteen and Forty-Five	August 31, 1918
12	1481	Determining the Price of Wheat for 1919	September 2, 1918
13	1482	Announcing the Licensing of Stockyards and Dealers in Products, Etc.	September 6, 1918
14	1483	Prohibiting the Use of Foods Etc., in Production of Malt Liquors	September 16, 1918
15	1484	Announcing the Licensing of Trading in Fuel Oil, Etc.	September 16, 1918
16	1485	Designating October 15 to December 16, 1918, as Period for Registration for Persons Between the Ages of Eighteen and Forty-Five in Alaska	September 18, 1918
17	1486	Appointing Saturday, October 1, 1918, as Liberty Day	September 19, 1918
18	1487	Setting Aside the Katmai National Monument, Alaska	September 24, 1918
19	1488	Designating October 26, 1918, as Registration Day for Persons Between the Ages of Eighteen and Forty-Five in Hawaii	October 10, 1918
20	1489	Designating October 26, 1918, as Registration Day for Persons Between the Ages of Eighteen and Forty-Five in Porto Rico	October 10, 1918
21	1490	Announcing Additional Regulations for Protecting Migratory Birds	October 25, 1918
22	1491	Announcing Licensing of Trading in Designated Edibles and Cereal Beverages	November 2, 1918
23	1492	Taking Possession of Certain Lands in Virginia for Navy Mine Depot Purposes	November 2, 1918
24	1492A	Taking Possession and Control of Marine Cable Systems	November 2, 1918
25	1493	Taking Immediate Possession of Certain Described Lands for Naval Purposes	November 4, 1918
26	1494	Taking of Additional Land in Virginia for Naval Ordnance Proving Ground	November 4, 1918
27	1495	Calling Virginia Coast Artillery Into Military Service of United States	November 7, 1918
28	1496	Designating Thursday, November 28, 1918, as a Day of General Thanksgiving	November 16, 1918
29	1497	Taking Possession and Control of American Railway Express Company	November 16, 1918
30	1498	Calling Part of Philippine Guard Into Military Service of United States	November 18, 1918
31	1499	Diminishing Area of Ozark National Forest, Arkansas	November 27, 1918
32	1500	Modifying Areas of the Blackfeet and Flathead National Forests, Montana	November 27, 1918
33	1501	Diminishing Area of the Custer National Forest, Montana	November 27, 1918
34	1502	Diminishing Area of the Deschutes National Forest, Oregon	November 27, 1918
35	1503	Designating Additional Persons Subject to Restrictions on Trading with the Enemy	November 29, 1918
36	1504	Taking Possession of Land at Cape May, N.J., for Naval Air Station	December 2, 1918
37	1504A	Determining Compensation for Certain German Dock Properties at Hoboken, N.J.	December 3, 1918
38	1505	Rescinding Prohibition Against Holding Aircraft Expositions	December 16, 1918
39	1506	Revoking Specified Regulations as to Conduct of Alien Enemies	December 23, 1918

=== 1919 ===
Relative No.	Absolute No.	Title/Description	Date signed
40	1506A	Canceling the Licenses of Designated Food Products No Longer Essential	January 7, 1919
41	1506B	Announcing Death of Former President Theodore Roosevelt	January 7, 1919
42	1507	Appointing Walker D. Hines Director General of Railroads	January 10, 1919
43	1508	Taking Possession of Additional Lands in Maryland for Army Ordnance Proving Ground	January 25, 1919
44	1509	Diminishing Area of the Nevada National Forest, Nevada	January 25, 1919
45	1510	Announcing the Licensing of Designated Products as No Longer Essential	January 25, 1919
46	1511	Permitting Use of Grain for Non-Intoxicating Beverages	January 30, 1919
47	1511A	Announcing the Licensing of Specified Necessaries as No Longer Essential	February 11, 1919
48	1512	Reserving Portion of Guano Islands, in Caribbean Sea, or Lighthouse Purposes	February 25, 1919
49	1513	Diminishing Area of the Helena National Forest, Montana	February 25, 1919
50	1514	Acquiring Additional Land in Maryland for Navy Proving Ground	March 4, 1919
51	1515	Modifying Order on Use of Foods, Etc., to Intoxicating Liquors	March 4, 1919
52	1516	Announcing the Licensing of Designated Products as No Longer Essential	March 19, 1919
53	1517	Restoring Lighthouse Reservation on Maui Island to Territory of Hawaii	April 8, 1919
54	1518	Diminishing Area of the Inyo National Forest, California and Nevada	April 8, 1919
55	1519	Diminishing Area of the Chugach National Forest, Alaska	April 16, 1919
56	1519A	Modifying Boundaries of the Chugach National Forest, Alaska	May 1, 1919
57	1520	Recommending Observance of Boy Scout Week, June 8 to 14, 1919	May 1, 1919
58	1520A	Convening Extra Session of Congress	May 7, 1919
59	1521	Announcing the Licensing of Designated Cottonseed Products as No Longer Essential	May 31, 1919
60	1522	Restoring Lighthouse Land in Honolulu to Hawaii	June 2, 1919
61	1522A	Reserving Roncador Cay, Caribbean Sea, for Lighthouse Purposes	June 5, 1919
62	1523	Modifying Area of the Humboldt National Forest, Nevada	June 12, 1919
63	1524	Diminishing Area of the La Sal National Forest, Utah and Colorado	June 19, 1919
64	1525	Diminishing Area of the Tahoe National Forest, California and Nevada	June 19, 1919
65	1526	Canceling Licenses for Rice and Rice Flour Dealers as No Longer Essential	June 19, 1919
66	1527	Announcing the Licensing of Wheat and Flour Storage, Etc., as Essential	June 23, 1919
67	1528	Prohibiting the Importation and Exportation of Wheat and Wheat Flour	June 24, 1919
68	1528A	Canceling Requirement for Licenses for Exporting Coin, Bullion, and Currency	June 26, 1919
69	1529	Enlarging Area of the Wyoming National Forest, Wyoming	July 10, 1919
70	1530	Prohibiting Illegal Export of Arms, Etc., to Mexico	July 12, 1919
71	1531	Prescribing Additional Regulations for Protection of Migratory Birds	July 28, 1919
72	1532	Abrogating Restrictions on Flying by Aircraft, Etc.	July 31, 1919
73	1533	Enlarging Area of the Crook National Forest, Arizona	August 6, 1919
74	1534	Diminishing Area of the Caribou National Forest, Idaho and Wyoming	August 21, 1919
75	1535	Terminating the Capital Issues Committee	August 30, 1919
76	1536	Diminishing Area of the Sioux National Forest, South Dakota and Montana	September 3, 1919
77	1537	Modifying Area of the Prescott National Forest, Arizona	September 29, 1919
78	1538	Modifying Area of the Coconino National Forest, Arizona	September 29, 1919
79	1539	Designating Thursday, November 27, 1919, as a Day of General Thanksgiving	November 5, 1919
80	1540	Urging Prompt and Accurate Answers to Census Inquiries	November 10, 1919
81	1541	Canceling Restrictions on Importing and Exporting Wheat and Wheat Flour	November 21, 1919
82	1542	Transferring Duties of Food Administration, Except Wheat and Wheat Products, to the Attorney General	November 21, 1919
83	1543	Authorizing Disposal of Surplus Coal in Alaska for Local Use	November 22, 1919
84	1544	Diminishing Area of the Nebraska National Forest, Nebraska	November 25, 1919
85	1545	Enlarging Area of the Gran Quivira National Monument, New Mexico	November 25, 1919
86	1546	Extending Area of the Lincoln National Forest, New Mexico	December 2, 1919
87	1547	Setting Aside Scotts Bluff National Monument, Nebraska	December 11, 1919
88	1548	Enlarging Area of the Shenandoah National Forest, Virginia and West Virginia	December 18, 1919
89	1549	Setting Aside the Yucca House National Monument, Colorado	December 19, 1919
90	1550	Relinquishing Federal Control of Railroads, Etc.	December 24, 1919
91	1551	Relinquishing Federal Control of American Railway Express Company	December 24, 1919
92	1552	Extending Area of the Idaho and Payette National Forests, Idaho	December 27, 1919

=== 1920 ===
Relative No.	Absolute No.	Title/Description	Date signed
93	1553	Setting Apart the Boone National Forest, North Carolina	January 16, 1920
94	1554	Setting Apart the Nantahala National Forest, Georgia, North Carolina, and South Carolina	January 29, 1920
95	1555	Designating Agency to Receive Reimbursement from Railroads, Etc., for Equipment Furnished While Under Federal Control	February 12, 1920
96	1556	Transferring Certain Property to Territory of Hawaii	February 17, 1920
97	1557	Copyright Benefits to Sweden Extended to Mechanical Musical Reproductions	February 27, 1920
98	1558	Designating Director General of Railroads Agent to Terminate Federal Control of Transportation Systems, Etc.	February 28, 1920
99	1559	Designating Director General of Railroads Agent in Actions Arising from Federal Control of Transportation Systems	March 11, 1920
100	1560	Copyright Benefits to Great Britain for Works Published Therein, Etc., Since August 1, 1914, and Not in United States	April 10, 1920
101	1561	Setting Apart the Mononagahela National Forest, Virginia and West Virginia	April 28, 1920
102	1562	Extending Time for Paying Installments for Ceded Lands of Crow Indian Reservation, Montana	May 5, 1920
103	1563	Appointing John Barton Payne Director General of Railroads	May 14, 1920
104	1564	Designating John Barton Payne as Agent in Actions Arising from Federal Control of Transportation Systems, Etc.	May 14, 1920
105	1565	Canceling Licenses of Dealers in Designated Cereals, Etc., as No Longer Essential	May 25, 1920
106	1566	Appointing Anthracite Coal Mining Commission	June 3, 1920
107	1567	Authorizing Coal Mining in Matanuska Field, Alaska, for Naval Uses	June 12, 1920
108	1568	Setting Apart the Cherokee National Forest, Georgia and Tennessee	June 14, 1920
109	1569	Prescribing Additional Regulations for Protection of Migratory Birds	July 9, 1920
110	1570	Declaring the Formal Opening of the Panama Canal	July 12, 1920
111	1571	Setting Apart the Unaka National Forest, North Carolina, Tennessee, and Virginia	July 24, 1920
112	1572	Recommending Observance of Tercentenary of Landing of the Pilgrims	August 4, 1920
113	1573	Designating October 9, 1920, as Fire Prevention Day	September 7, 1920
114	1574	Diminishing Area of the Trinity National Forest, California	October 1, 1920
115	1575	Enlarging Area of the Modoc National Forest, California	October 1, 1920
116	1576	Setting Aside Custer State Park Game Sanctuary, South Dakota	October 9, 1920
117	1577	Extending Area of the Arkansas National Forest, Arkansas	October 19, 1920
118	1578	Modifying Area of the Santa Fe National Forest, New Mexico	October 30, 1920
119	1579	Announcing the Licensing of Sugar, Etc., as No Longer Essential	October 30, 1920
120	1580	Designating Thursday, November 25, 1920, as a Day of General Thanksgiving	November 12, 1920
121	1581	Enlarging Area of the Florida National Forest, Florida	November 25, 1920
122	1582	Copyright Benefits to Denmark for Works Published Therein, Etc., Since August 1, 1914, and Not in United States	December 9, 1920
123	1583	Enlarging Area of the Caribou National Forest, Idaho and Wyoming	December 9, 1920

=== 1921 ===
Relative No.	Absolute No.	Title/Description	Date signed
124	1584	Convening Special Session of the Senate	February 3, 1921
125	1585	Transferring Certain Lands to Porto Rico for Highway Purposes	February 14, 1921
126	1586	Modifying Area of the Gila National Forest, New Mexico	March 3, 1921
127	1587	Modifying Area of the Datil National Forest, New Mexico	March 3, 1921
128	1588	Prescribing Further Regulations for Protection of Migratory Game Birds	March 3, 1921
