= List of executive actions by Jimmy Carter =

There are various kinds of executive actions that United States presidents may take.

Executive orders are issued to help officers and agencies of the executive branch manage the operations within the federal government itself. Presidential memoranda are closely related, and have the force of law on the Executive Branch, but are generally considered less prestigious. Presidential memoranda do not have an established process for issuance, and unlike executive orders, they are not numbered. A presidential determination is a determination resulting in an official policy or position of the executive branch of the United States government. A presidential proclamation is a statement issued by a president on a matter of public policy issued under specific authority granted to the president by Congress and typically on a matter of widespread interest. Administrative orders are signed documents such as notices, letters, and orders that can be issued to conduct administrative operations of the federal government. A presidential notice or a presidential sequestration order can also be issued. National security directives^{1} operate like executive orders, but are only in the area of national security. They have been issued by different presidents under various names.

Listed below are executive orders numbered 11967–12286 signed by United States President Jimmy Carter (1977–1981). He issued 320 executive orders. His executive orders are also listed on Wikisource, along with his presidential proclamations and presidential review memorandums.

Signature of Jimmy Carter

== Executive orders ==
=== 1977 ===
Relative No.	Absolute No.	Title/Description	Date signed
1	11967	Relating to Violations of the Selective Service Act, August 4, 1964 to March 28, 1973	January 21, 1977
2	11968	Withholding of District of Columbia, State and City Income or Employment Taxes	January 31, 1977
3	11969	Administration of the Emergency Natural Gas Act of 1977	February 2, 1977
4	11970	Presidential Advisory Board on Ambassadorial Appointments	February 5, 1977
5	11971	Establishing the Committee on Selection of the Director of the Federal Bureau of Investigation	February 11, 1977
6	11972	Establishing the United States Circuit Judge Nominating Commission	February 14, 1977
7	11973	President's Commission on Mental Health	February 17, 1977
8	11974	Amending the Generalized System of Preferences	February 25, 1977
9	11975	Abolishing the President's Economic Policy Board, and for other purposes	March 7, 1977
10	11976	Amending Executive Order No. 11861, as amended, placing certain positions in levels IV and V of the Executive Schedule	March 11, 1977
11	11977	Designating certain public international organizations entitled to enjoy certain privileges, exemptions, and immunities	March 14, 1977
12	11978	Relating to trade and other transactions involving Southern Rhodesia	March 18, 1977
13	11979	National Commission on the Observance of International Women's Year, 1975	March 28, 1977
14	11980	National Commission on the Observance of International Women's Year, 1975	March 29, 1977
15	11981	Establishing the Interagency Committee for the Purchase of United States Savings Bonds	March 29, 1977
16	11982	Committee on Selection of the Director of the Federal Bureau of Investigation	April 29, 1977
17	11983	Relating to certain positions in levels IV and V of the Executive Schedule	May 4, 1977
18	11984	Abolishing the President's Foreign Intelligence Advisory Board	May 4, 1977
19	11985	United States foreign intelligence activities	May 13, 1977
20	11986	Relating to certain positions in levels IV and V of the Executive Schedule	May 20, 1977
21	11987	Exotic organisms	May 24, 1977
22	11988	Floodplain management	May 24, 1977
23	11989	Off-road vehicles on public lands	May 24, 1977
24	11990	Protection of wetlands	May 24, 1977
25	11991	Relating to protection and enhancement of environmental quality	May 24, 1977
26	11992	Establishing the Committee on Selection of Federal Judicial Officers	May 24, 1977
27	11993	Relating to the United States Circuit Judge Nominating Commission	May 24, 1977
28	11994	United States foreign intelligence activities	June 1, 1977
29	11995	Relating to certain positions in level V of the Executive Schedule	June 8, 1977
30	11996	The Honorable Tom C. Clark	June 14, 1977
31	11997	Withholding of District of Columbia, State, city and county income or employment taxes	June 22, 1977
32	11998	President's Commission on Military Compensation	June 27, 1977
33	11999	Relating to certain positions in level V of the Executive Schedule	June 27, 1977
34	12000	Exemption of Arthur S. Flemming from mandatory retirement	June 29, 1977
35	12001	Transferring certain Bicentennial functions to the Secretary of the Interior	June 29, 1977
36	12002	Administration of the Export Administration Act of 1969, as amended	July 7, 1977
37	12003	Relating to energy policy and conservation	July 20, 1977
38	12004	Relating to Federal pay administration	July 20, 1977
39	12005	Amending the Generalized System of Preferences	July 23, 1977
40	12006	Exemption of G. Joseph Minetti from mandatory retirement	July 29, 1977
41	12007	Termination of certain Presidential advisory committees	August 22, 1977
42	12008	Presidential Management Intern Program	August 25, 1977
43	12009	Providing for the effectuation of the Department of Energy Organization Act	September 13, 1977
44	12010	Adjustments of certain rates of pay and allowances	September 28, 1977
45	12011	Exemption of G. Joseph Minetti from mandatory retirement	September 30, 1977
46	12012	White House Fellowships	October 3, 1977
47	12013	Relating to the Transfer of Certain Statistical Policy Functions	October 7, 1977
48	12014	Relating to the President's Award for Distinguished Federal Civilian Service	October 19, 1977
49	12015	Permitting students completing approved career-related work-study programs to be appointed to career or career-condition positions in the competitive service	October 26, 1977
50	12016	Exemption of G. Joseph Minetti from mandatory retirement	October 31, 1977
51	12017	Amending the Code of Conduct for Members of the Armed Forces of the United States	November 3, 1977
52	12018	Amending the Manual for Courts-Martial, United States, 1969 (Revised Edition)	November 3, 1977
53	12019	Establishing the Defense Meritorious Service Medal	November 3, 1977
54	12020	Payment of educational benefits to veterans and dependents when schools are temporarily closed to conserve energy	November 8, 1977
55	12021	Amending the Civil Service Rules to exempt certain positions from the Career Service	November 30, 1977
56	12022	Establishing the National Commission for the Review of Antitrust Laws and Procedures	December 1, 1977
57	12023	Conforming the Central Intelligence Agency and Civil Service Retirement and Disability Systems	December 1, 1977
58	12024	Relating to the transfer of certain advisory committee functions	December 1, 1977
59	12025	Relating to certain positions in level IV of the Executive Schedule	December 1, 1977
60	12026	Reinstatement rights of certain employees of the Department of Energy	December 5, 1977
61	12027	Relating to the transfer of certain executive development and other personnel functions	December 5, 1977
62	12028	Office of Administration in the Executive Office of the President	December 12, 1977
63	12029	Termination of a Presidential Advisory Committee	December 14, 1977
64	12030	Termination of the Federal Property Council	December 15, 1977
65	12031	Exemption of Jerome K. Kuykendall from mandatory retirement	December 21, 1977
66	12032	Amending the Generalized System of Preferences	December 27, 1977

=== 1978 ===
Relative No.	Absolute No.	Title/Description	Date signed
67	12033	Removal of certain international organizations no longer in existence from the list of those entitled to privileges and immunities	January 10, 1978
68	12034	Providing for the appointment of former ACTION cooperative volunteers to the civilian career service	January 10, 1978
69	12035	Relating to certain positions in level IV of the Executive Schedule	January 20, 1978
70	12036	United States Intelligence Activities	January 24, 1978
71	12037	Exemption of G. Joseph Minetti from mandatory retirement	January 31, 1978
72	12038	Relating to Certain Functions Transferred to the Secretary of Energy by the Department of Energy Organization Act	February 3, 1978
73	12039	Relating to the Transfer of Certain Science and Technology Policy Functions	February 24, 1978
74	12040	Relating to the Transfer of Certain Environmental Evaluation Functions	February 24, 1978
75	12041	Amending the Generalized System of Preferences	February 25, 1978
76	12042	Creating a Board of Inquiry to report on Labor disputes affecting the bituminous coal industry in the United States	March 6, 1978
77	12043	Amending the Civil Service Rules Regarding Notice of Exemptions From the Competitive Service	March 7, 1978
78	12044	Improving Government Regulations	March 23, 1978
79	12045	Relating to the Domestic Policy Staff, the Office of Drug Abuse Policy, and the Economic Opportunity Council	March 27, 1978
80	12046	Relating to the transfer of telecommunications functions	March 27, 1978
81	12047	Imported objects of cultural significance	March 27, 1978
82	12048	International Communication Agency	March 27, 1978
83	12049	Defense economic adjustment programs	March 27, 1978
84	12050	Establishing a National Advisory Committee for Women	April 4, 1978
85	12051	Waiver under the Trade Act of 1974 with respect to the Hungarian People's Republic	April 7, 1978
86	12052	National Commission for the Review of Antitrust Laws and Procedures	April 7, 1978
87	12053	National Commission on the International Year of the Child, 1979	April 14, 1978
88	12054	President's Commission on Foreign Language and International Studies	April 21, 1978
89	12055	Export of special nuclear material to India	April 27, 1978
90	12056	Exemption of G. Joseph Minetti from mandatory retirement	April 28, 1978
91	12057	National Advisory Committee for Women	May 8, 1978
92	12058	Functions relating to nuclear non-proliferation	May 11, 1978
93	12059	United States Circuit Judge Nominating Commission	May 11, 1978
94	12060	Relating to certain positions in levels IV and V of the Executive Schedule	May 15, 1978
95	12061	Small Business Conference Commission	May 18, 1978
96	12062	President's Commission on the Coal Industry	May 26, 1978
97	12063	United States Court of Military Appeals Nominating Commission	June 5, 1978
98	12064	United States Tax Court Nominating Commission	June 5, 1978
99	12065	National security information	June 28, 1978
100	12066	Inspection of Foreign assistance programs	June 29, 1978
101	12067	Providing for coordination of Federal equal employment opportunity programs	June 30, 1978
102	12068	Providing for transfer to the Attorney General of certain functions Under section 707 of Title VII of the Civil Rights Act of 1964, as amended	June 30, 1978
103	12069	Relating to certain positions in level IV of the Executive Schedule	June 30, 1978
104	12070	Adjustment of cost of living allowances	June 30, 1978
105	12071	President's Commission on Pension Policy	July 12, 1978
106	12072	Federal space management	August 16, 1978
107	12073	Federal procurement in labor surplus areas	August 16, 1978
108	12074	Urban and community impact analyses	August 16, 1978
109	12075	Interagency Coordinating Council	August 16, 1978
110	12076	Levels IV and V of the Executive Schedule	August 18, 1978
111	12077	Exemption of Roy T. Sessums from mandatory retirement	August 18, 1978
112	12078	Presidential Commission on World Hunger	September 5, 1978
113	12079	Authorizing certain functions of heads of Departments and Agencies under the Airport and Airway Development Act of 1970 to be performed without the approval of the President	September 18, 1978
114	12080	Commemorative Presidential proclamations	September 18, 1978
115	12081	Termination of expeditious naturalization based on military service	September 18, 1978
116	12082	Suspension of Certain Armed Forces promotion and disability separation limitations	September 19, 1978
117	12083	Energy Coordinating Committee	September 27, 1978
118	12084	Judicial Nominating Commission for the District of Puerto Rico	September 27, 1978
119	12085	Creating an emergency board to investigate a dispute between the Norfolk and Western Railway Company and certain of its employees	September 28, 1978
120	12086	Consolidation of contract compliance functions for equal employment opportunity	October 5, 1978
121	12087	Adjustments of certain rates of pay and allowances	October 7, 1978
122	12088	Federal Compliance With Pollution Control Standards	October 13, 1978
123	12089	National Productivity Council	October 23, 1978
124	12090	President's Commission on Foreign Language and International Studies	October 31, 1978
125	12091	Small Business Conference Commission	November 1, 1978
126	12092	Prohibition Against Inflationary Procurement Practices	November 1, 1978
127	12093	President's Commission on the Holocaust	November 1, 1978
128	12094	Special Pay for Sea Duty	November 1, 1978
129	12095	Creating an emergency board to investigate a dispute between Wien Air Alaska, Inc. and certain individuals	November 2, 1978
130	12096	Compensation of certain officials in the Industry and Trade Administration, Department of Commerce	November 2, 1978
131	12097	Standards and guidelines for the merit selection of United States District Judges	November 8, 1978
132	12098	Physical Fitness and Sports	November 14, 1978
133	12099	Levels IV and V of the Executive Schedule	November 17, 1978
134	12100	President's Commission on Pension Policy	November 17, 1978
135	12101	Privileges, immunities and liability insurance for diplomatic missions and personnel	November 17, 1978
136	12102	Trade Committees	November 17, 1978
137	12103	President's Commission on the Coal Industry	December 14, 1978
138	12104	Amending the Generalized System of Preferences	December 15, 1978
139	12105	Garnishment of moneys payable to employees of executive agencies and the District of Columbia	December 19, 1978
140	12106	Transfer of certain equal employment enforcement functions	December 28, 1978
141	12107	Relating to the Civil Service Commission and labor-management in the Federal service	December 28, 1978
142	12108	Employee Retirement Income Security Act transfers	December 28, 1978
143	12109	Federal physicians comparability allowance	December 28, 1978
144	12110	Continuance of certain Federal advisory committees	December 28, 1978

=== 1979 ===
Relative No.	Absolute No.	Title/Description	Date signed
145	12111	Levels IV and V of the Executive Schedule	January 2, 1979
146	12112	Seal for the Office of Administration	January 2, 1979
147	12113	Independent water project review	January 4, 1979
148	12114	Environmental effects abroad of major Federal actions	January 4, 1979
149	12115	Permanent American cemetery in the Republic of Panama	January 19, 1979
150	12116	Issuance of food stamps by the Postal Service	January 19, 1979
151	12117	Imports from Uganda	February 6, 1979
152	12118	Administration of Security Assistance Programs	February 6, 1979
153	12119	Levels IV and V of the Executive Schedule	February 14, 1979
154	12120	The Honorable Adolph Dubs	February 14, 1979
155	12121	Energy Coordinating Committee	February 26, 1979
156	12122	Office of Administration	February 26, 1979
157	12123	Offshore oil spill pollution	February 26, 1979
158	12124	Amending the Generalized System of Preferences	February 28, 1979
159	12125	Competitive status for handicapped Federal employees	March 15, 1979
160	12126	Correction in Executive Order No. 12107	March 29, 1979
161	12127	Federal Emergency Management Agency	March 31, 1979
162	12128	Employee-management relations in the Foreign Service	April 4, 1979
163	12129	Critical Energy Facility Program	April 5, 1979
164	12130	President's Commission on the Accident at Three Mile Island	April 11, 1979
165	12131	The President's Export Council	May 4, 1979
166	12132	Creating an emergency board to investigate a dispute between the National Railway Labor Conference and certain of its employees	May 8, 1979
167	12133	Drug policy functions	May 9, 1979
168	12134	Printing services within the Executive Office	May 9, 1979
169	12135	The President's Advisory Committee for Women	May 9, 1979
170	12136	The President's Commission on Executive Exchange	May 15, 1979
171	12137	The Peace Corps	May 16, 1979
172	12138	Creating a National Women's Business Enterprise Policy and prescribing arrangements for developing, coordinating and implementing a national program for women's business enterprise	May 18, 1979
173	12139	Foreign intelligence electronic surveillance	May 23, 1979
174	12140	Delegation of authorities relating to motor gasoline end-user allocation	May 29, 1979
175	12141	Independent water project review	June 5, 1979
176	12142	Alaska natural gas transportation system	June 21, 1979
177	12143	Maintaining unofficial relations with the people on Taiwan	June 22, 1979
178	12144	Transfer of certain equal pay and age discrimination in employment enforcement functions	June 22, 1979
179	12145	Foreign Service Retirement and Disability System	July 18, 1979
180	12146	Management of Federal legal resources	July 18, 1979
181	12147	United States International Development Cooperation Agency	July 19, 1979
182	12148	Federal Emergency Management	July 20, 1979
183	12149	Federal Regional Councils	July 20, 1979
184	12150	United States Sinai Support Mission	July 23, 1979
185	12151	President's Commission on the Holocaust	August 14, 1979
186	12152	Director of the Office of Management and Budget	August 14, 1979
187	12153	Decontrol of heavy oil	August 17, 1979
188	12154	Levels IV and V of the Executive Schedule	September 4, 1979
189	12155	Strategic and critical materials	September 10, 1979
190	12156	Corrective amendments	September 10, 1979
191	12157	President's Management Improvement Council	September 14, 1979
192	12158	Awards for special capability in the visual and performing arts and in creative writing	September 18, 1979
193	12159	Creating an emergency board to investigate disputes between the Chicago, Rock Island, Pacific Railroad & Peoria Terminal Company and Brotherhood of Railway, Airline & Steamship Clerks, Freight Handlers, Express and Station Employees; and the United Transportation Union	September 20, 1979
194	12160	Providing for enhancement and coordination of Federal consumer programs	September 26, 1979
195	12161	Second year of Anti-Inflation Program	September 28, 1979
196	12162	Amendment to Executive Order 12140	September 28, 1979
197	12163	Administration of foreign assistance and related functions	September 29, 1979
198	12164	Multilateral development institutions	September 29, 1979
199	12165	Adjustments of certain rates of pay and allowances	October 9, 1979
200	12166	Export-Import Bank	October 19, 1979
201	12167	Waiver under the Trade Act of 1974 with respect to the People's Republic of China	October 23, 1979
202	12168	President's Commission for a National Agenda for the Eighties	October 24, 1979
203	12169	United States Holocaust Memorial Council	October 26, 1979
204	12170	Blocking Iranian Government property	November 14, 1979
205	12171	Exclusions from the Federal Labor-Management Relations Program	November 19, 1979
206	12172	Entry of Iranian aliens into the United States	November 26, 1979
207	12173	Continuing applicability of Panama Canal regulations	November 29, 1979
208	12174	Paperwork	November 30, 1979
209	12175	Reorganization of functions relating to international trade	December 7, 1979
210	12176	President's Commission on the coal industry	December 7, 1979
211	12177	Federal Government pension plans	December 10, 1979
212	12178	Functions under the Foreign Assistance Act of 1961, as amended	December 10, 1979
213	12179	Providing for the closing of Government departments and agencies on Monday, December 24, 1979	December 11, 1979
214	12180	Amending the Generalized System of Preferences	December 11, 1979
215	12181	Amending the Generalized System of Preferences	December 11, 1979
216	12182	Creating an Emergency Board to investigate a dispute between the Long Island Rail Road and certain of its employees	December 14, 1979
217	12183	Revoking Rhodesian sanctions	December 16, 1979
218	12184	Relating to the President's Commission for the Study of Ethical Problems in Medicine and Biomedical and Behavioral Research	December 17, 1979
219	12185	Conservation of petroleum and natural gas	December 17, 1979
220	12186	Change in definition of heavy oil	December 21, 1979
221	12187	Base production control level for marginal properties	December 29, 1979

=== 1980 ===
Relative No.	Absolute No.	Title/Description	Date signed
222	12188	International trade functions	January 2, 1980
223	12189	Definition of heavy oil	January 16, 1980
224	12190	Advisory Committee on Small and Minority Business Ownership	February 1, 1980
225	12191	Federal Facility Ridesharing Program	February 1, 1980
226	12192	State Planning Council on Radioactive Waste Management	February 12, 1980
227	12193	Nuclear Cooperation With EURATOM	February 12, 1980
228	12194	Radiation Policy Council	February 21, 1980
229	12195	President's Commission on United States-Liberian Relations	February 22, 1980
230	12196	Occupational safety and health programs for Federal employees	February 26, 1980
231	12197	Central Intelligence Agency Retirement and Disability System	March 5, 1980
232	12198	Prescribing amendments to the Manual for Courts-Martial, United States, 1969 (Revised Edition)	March 12, 1980
233	12199	Levels IV and V of the Executive Schedule	March 12, 1980
234	12200	Rates of pay and allowances	March 12, 1980
235	12201	Credit control	March 14, 1980
236	12202	Nuclear Safety Oversight Committee	March 18, 1980
237	12203	Continuing applicability of Panama Canal regulations	March 26, 1980
238	12204	Amending the Generalized System of Preferences	March 27, 1980
239	12205	Prohibiting certain transactions with Iran	April 7, 1980
240	12206	Amendment of delegation of authority with respect to entry of certain aliens into the United States	April 7, 1980
241	12207	Creating an emergency board to investigate a dispute between the Port Authority Trans-Hudson Corporation and certain of its employees	April 12, 1980
242	12208	Consultations on the admission of refugees	April 15, 1980
243	12209	Base production level for marginal properties	April 16, 1980
244	12210	Administration of arms export controls	April 16, 1980
245	12211	Further prohibitions on transactions with Iran	April 17, 1980
246	12212	Department of Education	May 2, 1980
247	12213	United States Holocaust Memorial Council	May 2, 1980
248	12214	Administration of the Export Administration Act of 1979	May 2, 1980
249	12215	Delegation of Panama Canal functions	May 27, 1980
250	12216	President's Committee on the International Labor Organization	June 18, 1980
251	12217	Federal compliance with fuel use prohibitions	June 18, 1980
252	12218	Export of special nuclear material and components to India	June 19, 1980
253	12219	Presidential Commission on World Hunger	June 19, 1980
254	12220	Agricultural trade development	June 27, 1980
255	12221	Improving Government regulations	June 27, 1980
256	12222	Amending the Generalized System of Preferences	June 28, 1980
257	12223	Occupational safety and health programs for Federal employees	June 30, 1980
258	12224	Implementation of the International Sugar Agreement	July 1, 1980
259	12225	Credit control revocation	July 3, 1980
260	12226	Administration of foreign assistance	July 22, 1980
261	12227	United States Sinai Support Mission	July 22, 1980
262	12228	Allowances for personnel on foreign duty	July 24, 1980
263	12229	White House Coal Advisory Council	July 29, 1980
264	12230	Competitive status for special agents of the Drug Enforcement Administration	July 30, 1980
265	12231	Strategic petroleum reserve	August 4, 1980
266	12232	Historically Black Colleges and Universities	August 8, 1980
267	12233	Amendments to the Manual for Courts Martial, United States, 1969 (Revised edition)	September 1, 1980
268	12234	Enforcement of the Convention for the Safety of Life at Sea	September 3, 1980
269	12235	Management of natural gas supply emergencies	September 3, 1980
270	12236	Levels IV and V of the Executive Schedule	September 3, 1980
271	12237	Levels IV and V of the Executive Schedule	September 3, 1980
272	12238	Public international organizations entitled to enjoy privileges, exemptions, and immunities	September 12, 1980
273	12239	Suspension of certain Armed Forces promotion and disability separation limitations	September 21, 1980
274	12240	Nuclear Safety Oversight Committee	September 26, 1980
275	12241	National contingency plan	September 29, 1980
276	12242	Synthetic fuels	September 30, 1980
277	12243	Variable housing allowance	October 3, 1980
278	12244	Exemption for Fort Allen	October 3, 1980
279	12245	The Peace Corps Advisory Council	October 6, 1980
280	12246	Cuban and Haitian entrants	October 10, 1980
281	12247	Federal Actions in the Lake Tahoe region	October 15, 1980
282	12248	Adjustments of certain rates of pay and allowances	October 16, 1980
283	12249	Foreign Service Salary Schedule	October 25, 1980
284	12250	Leadership and coordination of nondiscrimination laws	November 2, 1980
285	12251	Cuban and Haitian entrants	November 15, 1980
286	12252	The Honorable John William McCormack	November 24, 1980
287	12253	Central Intelligence Agency Retirement and Disability System	November 26, 1980
288	12254	National Advisory Community Investment Board	December 3, 1980
289	12255	Providing for the Closing of Government Departments and Agencies on Friday, December 26, 1980	December 5, 1980
290	12256	Census statistics on legal immigrants	December 15, 1980
291	12257	Noncompetitive Conversion of CETA Participants to Career or Career-Conditional Civil Service Status	December 18, 1980
292	12258	Continuance of Certain Federal Advisory Committees	December 31, 1980
293	12259	Leadership and coordination of fair housing in Federal programs	December 31, 1980
294	12260	Agreement on Government procurement	December 31, 1980

=== 1981 ===
Relative No.	Absolute No.	Title/Description	Date signed
295	12261	Gasohol in Federal motor vehicles	January 5, 1981
296	12262	Interagency Employee Benefit Council	January 7, 1981
297	12263	Strategic and critical materials transaction authority	January 8, 1981
298	12264	Federal policy regarding the export of banned or significantly restricted materials	January 15, 1981
299	12265	Providing for enhancement and coordination of Federal consumer programs	January 15, 1981
300	12266	Food security wheat reserve	January 15, 1981
301	12267	Amending the Generalized System of Preferences	January 15, 1981
302	12268	Hostage Relief Act of 1980	January 15, 1981
303	12269	President's Committee on Small Business Policy	January 15, 1981
304	12270	President's Council on Spinal Cord Injury	January 15, 1981
305	12271	Continuance of certain Federal advisory committees	January 15, 1981
306	12272	Foreign Service Retirement and Disability System	January 16, 1981
307	12273	Central Intelligence Agency Retirement and Disability System	January 16, 1981
308	12274	Military pay and allowances	January 16, 1981
309	12275	Design Liaison Council	January 16, 1981
310	12276	Direction relating to establishment of escrow accounts	January 19, 1981
311	12277	Direction to transfer Iranian Government assets	January 19, 1981
312	12278	Direction to transfer Iranian Government assets overseas	January 19, 1981
313	12279	Direction to transfer Iranian Government assets held by domestic banks	January 19, 1981
314	12280	Direction to transfer Iranian Government financial assets held by non-banking institutions	January 19, 1981
315	12281	Direction to transfer certain Iranian Government assets	January 19, 1981
316	12282	Revocation of prohibitions against transactions involving Iran	January 19, 1981
317	12283	Non-prosecution of claims of hostages and for actions at the United States Embassy and elsewhere	January 19, 1981
318	12284	Restrictions on the transfer of property of the former Shah of Iran	January 19, 1981
319	12285	President's Commission on Hostage Compensation	January 19, 1981
320	12286	Responses to environmental damage	January 19, 1981

== See also ==
- List of executive actions by Gerald Ford, EO #11798–11966 (1974–1977)
- List of executive actions by Ronald Reagan, EO #12287–12667 (1981–1989)
