= List of executive actions by Richard Nixon =

The president of the United States may take any of several kinds of executive actions.

Executive orders are issued to help officers and agencies of the executive branch manage the operations within the federal government itself. Presidential memoranda are closely related, and have the force of law on the Executive Branch, but are generally considered less prestigious. Presidential memoranda do not have an established process for issuance, and unlike executive orders, they are not numbered. A presidential determination results in an official policy or position of the executive branch of the United States government. A presidential proclamation is a statement issued by a president on a matter of public policy, under specific authority granted to the president by Congress, typically on a matter of widespread interest. Administrative orders are signed documents such as notices, letters, and orders, that can be issued to conduct administrative operations of the federal government. A presidential notice or a presidential sequestration order can also be issued.

Listed below are executive orders numbered 11452–11797 signed by United States President Richard Nixon (1969–1974). He issued 346 executive orders. His executive orders are also listed on Wikisource, along with his presidential proclamations and national security decision memorandums.

Signature of Richard Nixon

== Executive orders ==
=== 1969 ===
Relative No.	Absolute No.	Title/Description	Date signed
1	11452	Establishing the Council for Urban Affairs	January 23, 1969
2	11453	Establishing the Cabinet Committee on Economic Policy	January 24, 1969
3	11454	Inspection of Income, Excess-Profits, Estate, and Gift Tax Returns by the Senate Committee on Government Operations	February 7, 1969
4	11455	Establishing an Office of Intergovernmental Relations	February 14, 1969
5	11456	Providing for a special assistant to the President for liaison with former Presidents	February 14, 1969
6	11457	Inspection of income, excess-profits, estate, and gift tax returns by the Committee on Government Operations, House of Representatives	March 4, 1969
7	11458	Prescribing arrangements for developing and coordinating a national program for minority business enterprise	March 5, 1969
8	11459	Designation of the Secretary of Transportation to approve and certificate containers and vehicles for use in international transport	March 7, 1969
9	11460	Establishing the President's Intelligence Advisory Board	March 20, 1969
10	11461	Inspection of income, estate, and gift tax returns by the Committee on Public Works, House of Representatives	March 27, 1969
11	11462	Providing for the closing of Government departments and agencies on March 31, 1969, and for the granting of administrative leave on March 28, 1969	March 28, 1969
12	11463	Placing an additional position in level V of the Federal Executive Salary Schedule	April 1, 1969
13	11464	Modifying Rates of Interest Equalization Tax	April 3, 1969
14	11465	Inspection of income, excess-profits, estate, and gift tax returns by the Committee on Internal Security, House of Representatives	April 10, 1969
15	11466	Administration of Certain Jointly Funded Projects	April 18, 1969
16	11467	Delegating to the Secretary of State authority to approve or reject recommendations and actions of certain fisheries commissions	May 1, 1969
17	11468	Amending Executive Order No. 11248, placing certain positions in levels IV and V of the Federal Executive Salary Schedule	May 10, 1969
18	11469	Extending the life of the National Commission on the Causes and Prevention of Violence	May 23, 1969
19	11470	Prescribing arrangements for the structure and conduct of a national program for voluntary action	May 26, 1969
20	11471	Relating to the implementation of the Convention on the Service Abroad of Judicial and Extrajudicial Documents in Civil or Commercial Matters	May 28, 1969
21	11472	Establishing the Environmental Quality Council and the Citizens' Advisory Committee on Environmental Quality	May 29, 1969
22	11473	Amending Executive Order No. 11157 as it relates to incentive pay for hazardous duty involving participation in flight operations on the flight deck of an aircraft carrier	June 14, 1969
23	11474	Adjusting rates of pay for certain statutory schedules	June 16, 1969
24	11475	Adjusting the rates of monthly basic pay for members of the Uniformed Services	June 16, 1969
25	11476	Prescribing the Manual for Courts-Martial, United States, 1969 (Revised edition)	June 19, 1969
26	11477	Authorizing the Atomic Energy Commission to make certain awards without the approval of the President	August 7, 1969
27	11478	Equal employment opportunity in the Federal Government	August 8, 1969
28	11479	The Honorable Everett McKinley Dirksen	September 8, 1969
29	11480	The President's Committee on Employment of the Handicapped	September 9, 1969
30	11481	The Honorable Everett McKinley Dirksen	September 10, 1969
31	11482	Establishing a Construction Industry Collective Bargaining Commission	September 22, 1969
32	11483	Inspection of income tax returns by the Select Committee on Crime, House of Representatives	September 23, 1969
33	11484	Designating the United International Bureau for the Protection of Intellectual Property (BIRPI) as a public international organization entitled to enjoy certain privileges, exemptions, and immunities	September 29, 1969
34	11485	Supervision and control of the National Guard of the District of Columbia	October 1, 1969
35	11486	Creating an emergency board to investigate disputes between the carriers represented by the National Railway Labor Conference and certain of their employees	October 3, 1969
36	11487	Designation of officers of the Department of the Interior to act as Secretary of the Interior	October 6, 1969
37	11488	Including certain lands in the Cherokee National Forest	October 13, 1969
38	11489	Amending Executive Order No. 11248, placing certain positions in levels IV and V of the Federal Executive Salary Schedule	October 27, 1969
39	11490	Assigning emergency preparedness functions to Federal departments and agencies	October 28, 1969
40	11491	Labor-management relations in the Federal service	October 29, 1969
41	11492	Amending Executive Order No. 11398 with respect to the Citizens Advisory Committee on Physical Fitness and Sports	October 30, 1969
42	11493	Establishing the Council for Rural Affairs	November 13, 1969
43	11494	Establishing the Presidential Citizens Medal	November 13, 1969
44	11495	Providing for the administration of the Disaster Relief Act of 1969	November 18, 1969
45	11496	Regulation governing the entry or withdrawal from warehouse of certain meat with respect to which an agreement has been concluded	November 21, 1969
46	11497	Amending the Selective Service regulations to prescribe random selection	November 26, 1969
47	11498	Delegating to the Secretary of Defense the authority to approve regulations governing the early discharge of enlisted members	December 1, 1969
48	11499	Amending Executive Order No. 11248, placing certain positions in levels IV and V of the Federal Executive Salary Schedule	December 11, 1969
49	11500	Amending Executive Order No. 11452, establishing the Council for Urban Affairs	December 12, 1969
50	11501	Administration of foreign military sales	December 22, 1969
51	11502	Enlarging the membership of the President's Committee on the National Medal of Science	December 22, 1969
52	11503	Excusing Federal employees from duty on December 26, 1969	December 23, 1969

=== 1970 ===
Relative No.	Absolute No.	Title/Description	Date signed
53	11504	Amending Executive Order No. 11248, placing certain positions in levels IV and V of the Federal Executive Salary Schedule	January 14, 1970
54	11505	Inspection of income, excess-profits, estate, and gift tax returns by the Senate Committee on the Judiciary	January 21, 1970
55	11506	Further amending Executive Order No. 11211, relating to the exclusion for original or new Japanese issues as required for international monetary stability	February 2, 1970
56	11507	Prevention, control, and abatement of air and water pollution at Federal facilities	February 4, 1970
57	11508	Providing for the identification of unneeded Federal real property	February 10, 1970
58	11509	Establishing the President's Advisory Council on Management Improvement	February 11, 1970
59	11510	Amending Executive Order No. 11248, placing certain positions in level IV and V of the Federal Executive Salary Schedule	February 16, 1970
60	11511	Amending Executive Order No. 11157 as it relates to basic allowances for quarters for members without dependents	February 27, 1970
61	11512	Planning, acquisition, and management of Federal space	February 27, 1970
62	11513	Establishing the President's Commission on School Finance	March 3, 1970
63	11514	Protection and enhancement of environmental quality	March 5, 1970
64	11515	Terminating certain bodies established by the President	March 13, 1970
65	11516	Amending Executive Order No. 11248, placing certain positions in levels IV and V of the Federal Executive Salary Schedule	March 19, 1970
66	11517	Providing for the issuance and signature by the Secretary of State of warrants appointing agents to return fugitives from justice extradited to the United States	March 19, 1970
67	11518	Providing for the increased representation of the interests of small business concerns before departments and agencies of the United States Government	March 20, 1970
68	11519	Calling into service members and units of the National Guard	March 23, 1970
69	11520	Amending Executive Order No. 11407, relating to the Presidential Service Certificate and the Presidential Service Badge	March 25, 1970
70	11521	Authorizing veterans readjustment appointments for veterans of the Vietnam era	March 26, 1970
71	11522	Assigning emergency preparedness functions to the United States Information Agency	April 6, 1970
72	11523	Establishing the National Industrial Pollution Control Council	April 9, 1970
73	11524	Adjusting rates of pay for certain statutory schedules	April 15, 1970
74	11525	Adjusting rates of monthly basic pay for members of the Uniformed Services	April 15, 1970
75	11526	Establishing the National Council on Federal Disaster Assistance	April 22, 1970
76	11527	Amending the Selective Service regulations	April 23, 1970
77	11528	Changing the jurisdiction and membership of the New England River Basins Commission	April 24, 1970
78	11529	Terminating obsolete bodies established by Executive order	April 24, 1970
79	11530	Amending Executive Order No. 10624, as amended, providing for regulations relating to personnel of the Department of Agriculture assigned to service abroad	May 26, 1970
80	11531	Delegating authority of the President under section 4102(a)(2)(B) of Title 5, United States Code, to designate U.S. marshals and U.S. attorneys for training	May 26, 1970
81	11532	Establishing the Interdepartmental Committee for (the) Voluntary Payroll Savings Plan for the Purchase of United States Savings Bonds	June 2, 1970
82	11533	Administration of the Export Administration Act of 1969	June 4, 1970
83	11534	Establishing the National Council on Organized Crime	June 4, 1970
84	11535	Inspection of tax returns by the Committee on the Judiciary, House of Representatives	June 12, 1970
85	11536	Establishing the President's Commission on Campus Unrest	June 13, 1970
86	11537	Amending the Selective Service regulations concerning the ordering of registrants for induction	June 16, 1970
87	11538	Delegating to the Secretary of Transportation the authority of the President to establish and conduct an International Aeronautical Exposition	June 29, 1970
88	11539	Delegations of authority to negotiate agreements and issue regulations limiting imports of certain meats	June 30, 1970
89	11540	Amending Executive Order No. 11248, placing certain positions in levels IV and V of the Federal Executive Salary Schedule	July 1, 1970
90	11541	Prescribing the duties of the Office of Management and Budget and the Domestic Council in the Executive Office of the President	July 1, 1970
91	11542	Amending Executive Order No. 11248, placing certain positions in levels IV and V of the Federal Executive Salary Schedule	July 2, 1970
92	11543	Creating an emergency board to investigate disputes between the carriers represented by the National Railway Labor Conferences and certain of their employees	July 7, 1970
93	11544	Establishing the Vice Presidential Service Certificate and the Vice Presidential Service Badge	July 8, 1970
94	11544	Establishing the Defense Distinguished Service Medal	July 9, 1970
95	11546	Establishing the President's Commission for the Observance of the Twenty-Fifth Anniversary of the United Nations	July 9, 1970
96	11547	Amending Executive Order No. 11330 with respect to membership and chairmanship	July 10, 1970
97	11548	Delegating functions of the President under the Federal Water Pollution Control Act, as amended	July 20, 1970
98	11549	Revoking Executive Order No. 10361 of June 11, 1952, establishing the Whittier Defensive Sea Area, Alaska	July 28, 1970
99	11550	Amending Executive Order No. 11248, placing certain positions in levels IV and V of the Federal Executive Salary Schedule	July 30, 1970
100	11551	Amending Executive Order No. 11399 with respect to the membership of the National Council on Indian Opportunity	August 11, 1970
101	11552	Providing for details and transfers of Federal employees to international organizations	August 24, 1970
102	11553	Amending the Selective Service regulations	August 26, 1970
103	11554	Suspending the provisions of section 5707(c) of title 10, United States Code, which relate to the establishment of a maximum percentage of Navy officers who may be recommended for promotion from below the appropriate promotion zone	August 29, 1970
104	11555	Amending the Selective Service regulations	September 2, 1970
105	11556	Assigning telecommunications functions	September 4, 1970
106	11557	Enlarging the membership of the President's Commission for the Observance of the Twenty-Fifth Anniversary of the United Nations	September 10, 1970
107	11558	Creating an emergency board to investigate disputes between the carriers represented by the National Railway Labor Conference and certain of their employees	September 18, 1970
108	11559	Creating an emergency board to investigate disputes between the carriers represented by the National Railway Labor Conference and certain of their employees	September 18, 1970
109	11560	Amending Executive Order No. 11508 with respect to the membership of the Property Review Board	September 23, 1970
110	11561	Delegation of certain authority under Title VIII of the Economic Opportunity Act	September 25, 1970
111	11562	Developing and coordinating a national program for physical fitness and sports	September 25, 1970
112	11563	Amending the Selective Service regulations	September 26, 1970
113	11564	Transfer of certain programs and activities to the Secretary of Commerce	October 6, 1970
114	11565	Amending Executive Order No. 11145 with respect to the membership of the Committee for the Preservation of the White House	October 13, 1970
115	11566	Consumer product information	October 26, 1970
116	11567	Prescribing the compensation of certain officials in the Bureau of Domestic Commerce, Department of Commerce	November 16, 1970
117	11568	Exempting A. Everette MacIntyre from compulsory retirement for age	November 16, 1970
118	11569	Amending the Selective Service regulations	November 24, 1970
119	11570	Providing for the regulation of conduct for the Postal Rate Commission and its employees	November 24, 1970
120	11571	Modifying Executive Order No. 6868 of October 9, 1934, as amended, designating the authority to carry out the provisions of the District of Columbia Alley Dwelling Act	December 8, 1970
121	11572	Providing for the use of transportation priorities and allocations during the current railroad strike	December 10, 1970
122	11573	Excusing Federal employees from duty for one-half day on December 24, 1970	December 21, 1970
123	11574	Administration of Refuse Act permit program	December 23, 1970
124	11575	Providing for the administration of the Disaster Relief Act of 1970	December 31, 1970

=== 1971 ===
Relative No.	Absolute No.	Title/Description	Date signed
125	11576	Adjusting rates of pay for certain statutory pay systems	January 8, 1971
126	11577	Adjusting the rates of monthly basic pay for members of the Uniformed Services	January 8, 1971
127	11578	Establishment of the Ohio River Basin Commission	January 13, 1971
128	11579	Overseas Private Investment Corporation	January 19, 1971
129	11580	Establishing a seal for the National Credit Union Administration	January 20, 1971
130	11581	Amending Executive Order No. 11248, placing certain positions in levels IV and V of the Federal Executive Salary Schedule	January 20, 1971
131	11582	Observance of Holidays by Government agencies	February 11, 1971
132	11583	Office of Consumer Affairs	February 24, 1971
133	11584	Inspection of income, excess-profits, estate, and gift tax returns by the Senate Committee on Government Operations	March 3, 1971
134	11585	Creating an emergency board to investigate disputes between certain carriers represented by the National Railway Labor Conference and the Eastern, Western and Southeastern Carriers' Conference Committees and certain of their employees represented by the Brotherhood of Railroad Signalmen	March 4, 1971
135	11586	Amending the Selective Service regulations	March 10, 1971
136	11587	Amending Executive Order No. 11248, placing certain positions in levels IV and V of the Federal Executive Salary Schedule	March 15, 1971
137	11588	Providing for the stabilization of wages and prices in the construction industry	March 29, 1971
138	11589	Delegating to the United States Civil Service Commission certain authorities of the President under the Intergovernmental Personnel Act of 1970 and the Federal Civil Defense Act of 1950	April 1, 1971
139	11590	Applicability of Executive Order No. 11222 and Executive Order 11478 to the United States Postal Service and of Executive Order No. 11478 to the Postal Rate Commission	April 23, 1971
140	11591	Amending Executive Order No. 11157 as it relates to basic allowances for quarters for members with dependents	April 23, 1971
141	11592	Delegating certain authority of the President to the Director of the Office of Management and Budget	May 6, 1971
142	11593	Protection and enhancement of the cultural environment	May 13, 1971
143	11594	Providing for the use of transportation priorities and allocations during the current railroad strike	May 17, 1971
144	11595	Amending Executive Order 11583, establishing the Office of Consumer Affairs	May 26, 1971
145	11596	Designating the Customs Cooperation Council as a public international organization entitled to enjoy certain privileges, exemptions, and immunities	June 5, 1971
146	11597	Amendment to Executive Order No. 11513 increasing the membership of the President's Commission on School Finance	June 11, 1971
147	11598	To provide for the listing of certain job vacancies by Federal agencies and Government contractors and subcontractors	June 16, 1971
148	11599	Establishing a special action office for drug abuse prevention	June 17, 1971
149	11600	Establishing a seal for the Office of Management and Budget	June 29, 1971
150	11601	Amending Executive Order No. 11390, providing for the delegation of certain functions of the President to the Secretary of Defense	June 29, 1971
151	11602	Providing for administration of the Clean Air Act with respect to Federal contracts, grants, or loans	June 29, 1971
152	11603	Assigning additional functions to the Director of ACTION	June 30, 1971
153	11604	Amending Executive Order No. 11248, placing certain positions in levels IV and V of the Federal executive salary schedule	July 2, 1971
154	11605	Amendment of Executive Order No. 10450 of April 27, 1953, relating to security requirements for Government employment	July 2, 1971
155	11606	Amending the Selective Service regulations	July 10, 1971
156	11607	Establishing the Advisory Council on Intergovernmental Personnel Policy	July 19, 1971
157	11608	Termination of Federal Field Committee for Development Planning in Alaska	July 19, 1971
158	11609	Delegating certain functions vested in the President to other officers of the Government	July 22, 1971
159	11610	Further amending Executive Order 10789 authorizing agencies of the Government to exercise certain contracting authority in connection with national defense functions and prescribing regulations governing the exercise of such authority	July 22, 1971
160	11611	Inspection of income, excess profits, estate, and gift tax returns by the Committee on Internal Security, House of Representatives	July 26, 1971
161	11612	Occupational safety and health programs for Federal employees	July 26, 1971
162	11613	Membership of Environmental Protection Agency on Established River Basin Commissions	August 2, 1971
163	11614	Establishing the National Business Council for Consumer Affairs	August 5, 1971
164	11615	Providing for stabilization of prices, rents, wages, and salaries	August 15, 1971
165	11616	Amending Executive Order No. 11491, relating to labor-management relations in the Federal service	August 26, 1971
166	11617	Amending Executive Order No. 11615, providing for stabilization of prices, rents, wages, and salaries	September 2, 1971
167	11618	Further amending Executive Order No. 10713, providing for administration of the Ryukyu Islands	September 10, 1971
168	11619	Exemption of Rose A. Conway from mandatory retirement	September 22, 1971
169	11620	The Honorable Hugo L. Black	September 25, 1971
170	11621	Creating a board of inquiry to report on certain labor disputes affecting the maritime industry of the United States	October 4, 1971
171	11622	Amending Executive Order 11621 creating a board of inquiry	October 5, 1971
172	11623	Delegating to the Director of Selective Service authority to issue rules and regulations under the Military Selective Service Act	October 12, 1971
173	11624	Inspection of income, excess profits, estate, gift, and excise tax returns by the Senate Committee on Commerce	October 12, 1971
174	11625	Prescribing additional arrangements for developing and coordinating a national program for minority business enterprise	October 13, 1971
175	11626	The Honorable Dean Acheson	October 13, 1971
176	11627	Further providing for the stabilization of the economy	October 15, 1971
177	11628	Establishing a seal for the Environmental Protection Agency	October 18, 1971
178	11629	Delegation of authority to the Secretary of State to perform the function vested in the President by article IV of the Convention Between the United States of America and Mexico for the Protection of Migratory Birds and Game Mammals (50 Stat. 1311; TS 912)	October 26, 1971
179	11630	Amending Executive Order No. 11627 of October 15, 1971, further providing for the stabilization of the economy	October 30, 1971
180	11631	Inspection of income, estate, and gift tax returns by the Committee on Public Works, House of Representatives	November 9, 1971
181	11632	Amending Executive Order No. 11627 of October 15, 1971, further providing for the stabilization of the economy	November 22, 1971
182	11633	Security clearance program for United States citizens employed directly by the North Atlantic Treaty Organization, the South-East Asia Treaty Organization, and the Central Treaty Organization	December 3, 1971
183	11634	Amending Executive Order No. 11248, placing certain positions in levels IV and V of the Federal Executive Salary Schedule	December 6, 1971
184	11635	Continuation of Souris-Red-Rainy-River Basins Commission	December 9, 1971
185	11636	Employee-management relations in the Foreign Service of the United States	December 17, 1971
186	11637	Adjusting rates of pay for certain statutory pay systems	December 22, 1971
187	11638	Adjusting the rates of monthly basic pay for members of the Uniformed Services	December 22, 1971

=== 1972 ===
Relative No.	Absolute No.	Title/Description	Date signed
188	11639	Providing for pay adjustments for Federal prevailing rate systems	January 11, 1972
189	11640	Further providing for the stabilization of the economy	January 26, 1972
190	11641	Concentration of law enforcement activities relating to drug abuse	January 28, 1972
191	11642	Further exempting A. Everette MacIntyre from compulsory retirement for age	February 1, 1972
192	11643	Environmental safeguards on activities for animal damage control on Federal lands	February 8, 1972
193	11644	Use of off-road vehicles on the public lands	February 8, 1972
194	11645	Authority of the Secretary of Transportation to prescribe certain regulations relating to Coast Guard housing	February 8, 1972
195	11646	Membership of Department of State on the Great Lakes Basin Commission	February 8, 1972
196	11647	Federal Regional Councils	February 10, 1972
197	11648	Amendment of Executive Order No. 11183 which established the President's Commission on White House Fellowships	February 16, 1972
198	11649	Regulations governing the seals of the President and the Vice President of the United States	February 16, 1972
199	11650	Inspection by certain classes of persons and State and Federal Government establishments of returns made in respect of certain taxes imposed by the Internal Revenue Code of 1954	February 16, 1972
200	11651	Textile Trade Agreements	March 3, 1972
201	11652	Classification and declassification of national security information and material	March 8, 1972
202	11653	Exemption of Jack T. Stuart from compulsory retirement for age	March 9, 1972
203	11654	Transfer of the Federal Fire Council to the Department of Commerce	March 13, 1972
204	11655	Inspection of income, excess-profits, estate, and gift tax returns by the Committee on Government Operations, House of Representatives	March 14, 1972
205	11656	Inspection of income, estate, and gift tax returns by the Select Committee on Crime, House of Representatives	March 14, 1972
206	11657	Exemption of C. Everette Spangler from compulsory retirement for age	March 22, 1972
207	11658	Establishment of the Missouri River Basin Commission	March 22, 1972
208	11659	Establishment of the Upper Mississippi River Basin Commission	March 22, 1972
209	11660	Amending Executive Order No. 11640, further providing for the stabilization of the economy	March 23, 1972
210	11661	Relating to facilitating coordination of Federal education programs	March 24, 1972
211	11662	Further providing for the administration of the Disaster Relief Act of 1970, as amended	March 29, 1972
212	11663	Creating an emergency board to investigate disputes between the carriers represented by the National Railway Labor Conference and certain of their employees	March 31, 1972
213	11664	Creating an emergency board to investigate a dispute between the Penn Central Transportation Company and certain of its employees	March 31, 1972
214	11665	James F. Byrnes	April 10, 1972
215	11666	Qualification for the investment credit on certain articles and classes of articles of predominantly foreign origin	April 11, 1972
216	11667	Establishing the President's Advisory Committee on the Environmental Merit Awards Program	April 19, 1972
217	11668	Providing for a National Center for Housing Management	April 21, 1972
218	11669	J. Edgar Hoover	May 2, 1972
219	11670	Providing for the return of certain lands to the Yakima Indian Reservation	May 20, 1972
220	11671	Committee management	June 5, 1972
221	11672	Providing for the transfer or furnishing of property under the Postal Reorganization Act	June 6, 1972
222	11673	Amending Executive Order No. 8684 to redefine the Culebra Island Naval Defensive Sea Area	June 6, 1972
223	11674	Amending Executive Order No. 11640, as amended, further providing for the stabilization of the economy	June 29, 1972
224	11675	Exemption of John S. Patterson from mandatory retirement for age	July 26, 1972
225	11676	Providing for the establishment of an Office of National Narcotics Intelligence within the Department of Justice	July 27, 1972
226	11677	Continuing the regulation of exports	August 1, 1972
227	11678	Providing for the repair and restoration of nonprofit private educational institutions damaged by hurricane and tropical storm Agnes	August 16, 1972
228	11679	Creating an emergency board to investigate a dispute between the Long Island Rail Road Company and certain of its employees	August 19, 1972
229	11680	Designation of certain officers to act as Secretary of the Treasury	August 21, 1972
230	11681	Revoking Executive Order No. 5221 of November 11, 1929, establishing a limitation on non-official employment of officers or employees of the American Government	August 21, 1972
231	11682	Inspection by the Department of the Treasury of tax returns made under the Internal Revenue Code of 1954 for economic stabilization purposes	August 29, 1972
232	11683	Revoking Executive Order No. 11677 of August 1, 1972, and continuing in effect Executive Order No. 11533 of June 4, 1970, relating to the administration of export controls	August 29, 1972
233	11684	Amendment of Executive Order No. 11554, suspending the provisions of section 5707(c) of title 10, United States Code, which relate to promotion of Navy and Marine Corps officers	August 30, 1972
234	11685	Amending Executive Order No. 10973, relating to administration of foreign assistance and related functions, and Executive Order No. 11501, relating to administration of foreign military sales	September 25, 1972
235	11686	Committee management	October 7, 1972
236	11687	Delegating functions conferred upon the President by section 1455 of title 10 of the United States Code, establishing the Retired Serviceman's Survivor Benefit Plan	October 11, 1972
237	11688	Amending Executive Order No. 11399 with respect to the membership of the National Council on Indian Opportunity	December 1, 1972
238	11689	Extending diplomatic privileges and immunities to the Mission to the United States of America of the Commission of the European Communities and to certain members thereof	December 5, 1972
239	11690	Delegation of certain functions to the Executive Director of the Domestic Council	December 14, 1972
240	11691	Adjusting rates of pay for certain statutory pay systems	December 15, 1972
241	11692	Adjusting the rates of monthly basic pay for members of the Uniformed Services	December 15, 1972
242	11693	Providing for the closing of Government departments and agencies on December 28, 1972	December 26, 1972

=== 1973 ===
Relative No.	Absolute No.	Title/Description	Date signed
243	11694	Creating an emergency board to investigate a dispute between the Port Authority Trans-Hudson Corporation and certain of its employees	January 2, 1973
244	11695	Further providing for the stabilization of the economy	January 11, 1973
245	11696	Excusing Federal employees in the Washington, DC., metropolitan area from duty for one-half day on Friday, January 19, 1973	January 17, 1973
246	11697	Inspection by Department of Agriculture of income tax returns made under the Internal Revenue Code of 1954 of persons having farm operations	January 17, 1973
247	11698	Relating to the implementation of the Convention on the Taking of Evidence Abroad in Civil or Commercial Matters	January 19, 1973
248	11699	Amending Executive Order No. 11248, placing certain positions in levels IV and V of the Federal Executive Salary	January 22, 1973
249	11700	Providing for the closing of Government departments and agencies on Thursday, January 25, 1973	January 23, 1973
250	11701	Employment of veterans by Federal agencies and Government contractors and subcontractors	January 24, 1973
251	11702	Relative to the Executive Office of the President	January 25, 1973
252	11703	Assigning policy development and direction functions with respect to the oil import control program	February 7, 1973
253	11704	Further exempting A. Everett MacIntyre from compulsory retirement for age	February 28, 1973
254	11705	The Honorable Cleo A. Noel, Junior George Curtis Moore	March 6, 1973
255	11706	Inspection of returns by U.S. attorneys and attorneys of Department of Justice and use of returns in grand jury proceedings and in litigation	March 8, 1973
256	11707	Change in boundaries of New England River Basins Commission	March 12, 1973
257	11708	Placing certain positions in levels IV and V of the Executive Schedule	March 23, 1973
258	11709	Inspection by Department of Agriculture of income tax returns made under the Internal Revenue Code of 1954 of persons having farm operations	March 27, 1973
259	11710	National Commission for Industrial Peace	April 4, 1973
260	11711	Inspection of income, excess-profits, estate, and gift tax returns by the Senate Committee on Government Operations	April 13, 1973
261	11712	Special Committee on Energy and National Energy Office	April 18, 1973
262	11713	Delegating certain functions vested in the President to the Administrator of General Services	April 21, 1973
263	11714	Amending Executive Order No. 11652 on classification and declassification of national security information and material	April 24, 1973
264	11715	Amending Executive Order No. 11708, placing certain positions in levels IV and V of the Executive Schedule	April 24, 1973
265	11716	Amending Executive Order No. 11157 as it relates to incentive pay for hazardous duty	April 26, 1973
266	11717	Transferring certain functions from the Office of Management and Budget to the General Services Administration and the Department of Commerce	May 9, 1973
267	11718	Designating the International Telecommunications Satellite Organization (Intelsat) as an international organization entitled to enjoy certain privileges, exemptions, and immunities	May 14, 1973
268	11719	Inspection of income, estate, and gift tax returns by the Committee on Public Works, House of Representatives	May 17, 1973
269	11720	Inspection of income, excess-profits, estate, gift, and excise tax returns by the Senate Committee on Commerce	May 17, 1973
270	11721	Providing for Federal pay administration	May 23, 1973
271	11722	Inspection of income, estate, and gift tax returns by the Committee on Internal Security, House of Representatives	June 9, 1973
272	11723	Further providing for the stabilization of the economy	June 13, 1973
273	11724	Federal Property Council	June 25, 1973
274	11725	Transfer of certain functions of the Office of Emergency Preparedness	June 27, 1973
275	11726	Energy Policy Office	June 29, 1973
276	11727	Drug law enforcement	July 6, 1973
277	11728	Amending section 104(b)(1) of Executive Order No. 11157, as it relates to incentive pay for hazardous duty involving aerial flight	July 12, 1973
278	11729	Amending Executive Order No. 11710 of April 4, 1973, relative to the National Commission for Industrial Peace	July 12, 1973
279	11730	Further providing for the stabilization of the economy	July 18, 1973
280	11731	Amending Executive Order No. 11647 relating to Federal Regional Councils	July 23, 1973
281	11732	Delegating certain authority of the President to the Secretary of Housing and Urban Development	July 30, 1973
282	11733	Further amending Executive Order No. 10122 of April 14, 1950, entitled ``Regulations governing payment of disability retirement pay hospitalization, and re-examination of members and former members of the Uniformed Services	July 30, 1973
283	11734	Revising the membership of the President's Committee on the National Medal of Science	July 30, 1973
284	11735	Assignment of functions under section 311 of the Federal Water Pollution Control Act, as amended	August 3, 1973
285	11736	Amending Executive Order No. 11708, placing certain positions in levels IV and V of the Executive Schedule	August 6, 1973
286	11737	Enlargement of the Upper Mississippi River Basin Commission	September 7, 1973
287	11738	Providing for administration of the Clean Air Act and the Federal Water Pollution Control Act with respect to Federal contracts, grants or loans	September 10, 1973
288	11739	Adjusting rates of pay for certain statutory pay systems	October 3, 1973
289	11740	Adjusting the rates of monthly basic pay for members of the Uniformed Services	October 3, 1973
290	11741	Federal agency use of the official American Revolution Bicentennial symbol	October 15, 1973
291	11742	Delegating to the Secretary of State certain functions with respect to the negotiation of international agreements relating to the enhancement of the environment	October 23, 1973
292	11743	Modifying Proclamation 3279, as amended, with respect to the Oil Policy Committee	October 23, 1973
293	11744	Cost-of-living allowance provided to employees of the Joint Federal-State Land Use Planning Commission for Alaska	October 24, 1973
294	11745	Creating an emergency board to investigate a dispute between the Long Island Rail Road and certain of its employees	November 1, 1973
295	11746	Assigning emergency preparedness functions to the United States Treasury Department	November 7, 1973
296	11747	Delegating certain authority of the President under the Water Resources Planning Act, as amended	November 7, 1973
297	11748	Federal Energy Office	December 4, 1973
298	11749	Consolidating disaster relief functions assigned to the Secretary of Housing and Urban Development	December 10, 1973
299	11750	Providing for the closing of Government departments and agencies on Monday, December 24, 1973 and Monday, December 31, 1973	December 13, 1973
300	11751	Authorizing the Secretary of Transportation to grant exemptions from daylight saving time and realignments of time zone limits	December 15, 1973
301	11752	Prevention, control, and abatement of environmental pollution at Federal facilities	December 17, 1973
302	11753	Establishing the President's Export Council and for other purposes	December 20, 1973
303	11754	Modifying rates of interest equalization tax	December 26, 1973
304	11755	December 29, 1973	
305	11756	Exemption of Whitney Gillilland from mandatory retirement	December 30, 1973
306	11757	Exemption of Lawrence Quincy Mumford from mandatory retirement	December 30, 1973

=== 1974 ===
Relative No.	Absolute No.	Title/Description	Date signed
307	11758	Delegating authority of the President under the Rehabilitation Act of 1973	January 15, 1974
308	11759	Prescribing the compensation of certain officials in the Domestic and International Business Administration, Department of Commerce	January 15, 1974
309	11760	Designating the European Space Research Organization (ESRO) as a public international organization entitled to enjoy certain privileges, exemptions, and immunities	January 17, 1974
310	11761	To facilitate coordination of Federal education programs	January 17, 1974
311	11762	Delegating to the Administrator of Veterans' Affairs certain authority relating to grants-in-aid to the Republic of the Philippines for medical care and treatment of veterans	January 17, 1974
312	11763	Establishing a National Commission for the Observance of World Population Year	January 17, 1974
313	11764	Nondiscrimination in federally assisted programs	January 21, 1974
314	11765	Sale of vessels of the Navy	January 21, 1974
315	11766	Modifying rates of interest equalization tax	January 29, 1974
316	11767	Designating the Organization of African Unity as a public international organization entitled to enjoy certain privileges, exemptions, and immunities	February 19, 1974
317	11768	Placing certain positions in levels IV and V of the Executive Schedule	February 20, 1974
318	11769	Advisory committee management	February 21, 1974
319	11770	International Symposium on Geothermal Energy—1975	February 21, 1974
320	11771	Extending diplomatic privileges and immunities to the Liaison Office of the People's Republic of China in Washington, DC and to members thereof	March 18, 1974
321	11772	Delegating certain authority of the President to the Secretary of State	March 21, 1974
322	11773	Revoking the authority of the Department of Agriculture to inspect income tax returns	March 21, 1974
323	11774	Amending Executive Order No. 11768, placing certain positions in levels IV and V of the Executive Schedule	March 26, 1974
324	11775	Abolishing the Energy Policy Office	March 26, 1974
325	11776	Continuing the President's Committee on Mental Retardation and broadening its membership and responsibilities	March 28, 1974
326	11777	Amending Executive Order No. 11691, adjusting rates of pay for certain statutory pay systems	April 12, 1974
327	11778	Amending Executive Order No. 11692, adjusting the rates of monthly basic pay for members of the Uniformed Services	April 12, 1974
328	11779	Delegating the authority of the President under section 9 of the United Nations Participation Act, as amended, to the Secretary of State	April 19, 1974
329	11780	Amending Executive Order No. 11768, placing certain positions in levels IV and V of the Executive Schedule	April 22, 1974
330	11781	Providing for an orderly termination of the Economic Stabilization Program	May 1, 1974
331	11782	Establishing the Federal Financing Bank Advisory Council	May 6, 1974
332	11783	Creating an emergency board to investigate a dispute between the carriers represented by the National Railway Labor Conference and certain of their employees	May 21, 1974
333	11784	Delegating to the Administrator of General Services certain authority to issue regulations relating to joint funding	May 30, 1974
334	11785	Amending Executive Order No. 10450, as amended, relating to security requirements for Government employment and for other purposes	June 4, 1974
335	11786	Inspection of tax returns by the Committee on the Judiciary, House of Representatives	June 7, 1974
336	11787	Revoking Executive Order No. 10987, relating to agency systems for appeals from adverse actions	June 11, 1974
337	11788	Providing for the orderly termination of economic stabilization activities	June 18, 1974
338	11789	President's Committee on East-West Trade Policy	June 25, 1974
339	11790	Providing for the effectuation of the Federal Energy Administration Act of 1974	June 25, 1974
340	11791	Exemption of Kenneth H. Tuggle from mandatory retirement	June 25, 1974
341	11792	Abolishing the Advisory Council on Intergovernmental Personnel Policy	June 25, 1974
342	11793	Designation of certain officers of the Department of Agriculture to act as Secretary of Agriculture	July 10, 1974
343	11794	Revoking Executive Order No. 10958, relating to the Civil Defense medical and food stockpiles	July 11, 1974
344	11795	Delegating disaster relief functions pursuant to the Disaster Relief Act of 1974	July 11, 1974
345	11796	Continuing the regulation of exports	July 30, 1974
346	11797	Delegating to the Secretary of Agriculture the function of submitting an annual report to the Congress concerning the location of new Federal facilities in rural areas	July 31, 1974

== See also ==
- List of executive actions by Lyndon B. Johnson, EO #11128–11451 (1963–1969)
- List of executive actions by Gerald Ford, EO #11798–11966 (1974–1977)
