= List of executive actions by Gerald Ford =

There are various kinds of executive actions that United States presidents may take.

Executive orders are issued to help officers and agencies of the executive branch manage the operations within the federal government itself. Presidential memoranda are closely related, and have the force of law on the Executive Branch, but are generally considered less prestigious. Presidential memoranda do not have an established process for issuance, and unlike executive orders, they are not numbered. A presidential determination is a determination resulting in an official policy or position of the executive branch of the United States government. A presidential proclamation is a statement issued by a president on a matter of public policy issued under specific authority granted to the president by Congress and typically on a matter of widespread interest. Administrative orders are signed documents such as notices, letters, and orders that can be issued to conduct administrative operations of the federal government. A presidential notice or a presidential sequestration order can also be issued. National security directives^{1} operate like executive orders, but are only in the area of national security. They have been issued by different presidents under various names.

Listed below are executive orders numbered 11798–11966 signed by United States President Gerald Ford (1974–1977). He issued 169 executive orders. His executive orders are also listed on Wikisource, along with his presidential proclamations.

Signature of Gerald Ford

== Executive orders ==
=== 1974 ===
Relative No.	Absolute No.	Title/Description	Date signed
1	11798	Revoking Executive Order No. 11796 of July 30, 1974, and Continuing in effect Executive Order No. 11533 of June 4, 1970, relating to the administration of Export Controls	August 14, 1974
2	11799	Amending Executive Order No. 11554 as it relates to the establishment of a maximum percentage of Navy and Marine Corps officers who may be recommended for promotion from below the appropriate promotion zone	August 17, 1974
3	11800	Delegating certain authority vested in the President by the Aviation Career Incentive Act of 1974	August 17, 1974
4	11801	The Honorable Rodger P. Davies	August 21, 1974
5	11802	General Creighton W. Abrams, Chief of Staff, United States Army	September 4, 1974
6	11803	Establishing a Clemency Board to review certain convictions of persons under section 12 or 6 (j) of the Military Selective Service Act and certain discharges issued because of, and certain convictions for, violations of Article 85, 86, or 87 of the Uniform Code of Military Justice and to make recommendations for executive clemency with respect thereto	September 16, 1974
7	11804	Delegation of certain functions vested in the President to the Director of Selective Service	September 16, 1974
8	11805	Inspection by President and certain designated employees of the White House Office of Tax Returns made under the Internal Revenue Code of 1954	September 20, 1974
9	11806	Amending Executive Order No. 11763 of January 17, 1974, to extend the life of the National Commission for the Observance of World Population Year	September 25, 1974
10	11807	Occupational safety and health programs for Federal employees	September 28, 1974
11	11808	Establishing the President's Economic Policy Board, and for other purposes	September 30, 1974
12	11809	Establishing the President's Labor-Management Committee	September 30, 1974
13	11810	Continuing the regulation of exports	September 30, 1974
14	11811	Adjusting rates of pay for certain statutory pay systems	October 7, 1974
15	11812	Adjusting the rates of basic pay, basic allowance for subsistence and basic allowance for quarters for members of the Uniformed Services	October 7, 1974
16	11813	Permitting cooperative education students to be given career or career-conditional appointments	October 7, 1974
17	11814	Activation of the Energy Resources Council	October 11, 1974
18	11815	Delegating to the National Capital Planning Commission the function of establishing the metes and bounds of the National Capital Service Area	October 23, 1974
19	11816	Delegation of certain reporting functions under the Foreign Assistance Act to the Secretary of the Treasury	October 23, 1974
20	11817	Delegating the United States Civil Service Commission as the agent to concur with agency determinations fixing the age limits within which original appointments may be made with respect to law enforcement officer and firefighters positions	November 5, 1974
21	11818	Revoking Executive Order No. 11810 of September 30, 1974, and continuing in effect Executive Order No. 11533 of June 4, 1970, relating to the administration of export control	November 5, 1974
22	11819	Membership of the Energy Resources Council	November 16, 1974
23	11820	International Council on Archives-Bicentennial Year Meeting	November 27, 1974
24	11821	Inflation impact statements	November 27, 1974
25	11822	Designation of certain officers to act as Secretary of the Treasury	December 10, 1974
26	11823	Abolishing the National Commission for Industrial Peace	December 12, 1974
27	11824	Exemption of Whitney Gillilland from mandatory retirement	December 28, 1974
28	11825	Revocation of Executive orders pertaining to the regulation of the acquisition of, holding of, or other transactions in gold	December 31, 1974
29	11826	Exemption of Willard Deason from mandatory retirement	December 31, 1974

=== 1975 ===
Relative No.	Absolute No.	Title/Description	Date signed
30	11827	Continuance of certain Federal advisory committees	January 4, 1975
31	11828	Establishing a commission on CIA activities within the United States	January 4, 1975
32	11829	The Hopi-Navajo Land Settlement Interagency Committee	January 6, 1975
33	11830	Enlarging the membership of the Interagency Committee on Handicapped Employees	January 9, 1975
34	11831	Amending Executive Order No. 11768, placing certain positions in levels IV and V of the Executive Schedule	January 9, 1975
35	11832	Establishing a National Commission on the Observance of International Women's Year, 1975	January 9, 1975
36	11833	Withholding of city income or employment taxes by Federal agencies	January 13, 1975
37	11834	Activation of the Energy Research and Development Administration and the Nuclear Regulatory Commission	January 15, 1975
38	11835	Prescribing amendments to the Manual for Courts-Martial, United States, 1969 (revised edition)	January 27, 1975
39	11836	Increasing the effectiveness of the Transportation Cargo Security Program	January 27, 1975
40	11837	Amending Executive Order No. 11803 of September 16, 1974, to extend the period for application for Clemency Board review of certain convictions and military service discharges	January 30, 1975
41	11838	Amending Executive Order No. 11491, as amended by Executive Orders 11616 and 11636, relating to labor-management relations in the Federal service	February 6, 1975
42	11839	Amending the civil service rules to except certain positions in regional offices from the career service	February 15, 1975
43	11840	Waiver of certain provisions of law and limitations of authority	February 18, 1975
44	11841	Amending Executive Order No. 10973, relating to administration of foreign assistance and related functions, to provide for a Development Coordination Committee	February 28, 1975
45	11842	Amending Executive Order Nos. 11803 and 11837 to further extend the period for application for Clemency Board review of certain convictions and military service discharges	February 28, 1975
46	11843	Amending Executive Order No. 11768, placing certain positions in levels IV and V of the Executive Schedule	March 18, 1975
47	11844	Designation of beneficiary developing countries for the Generalized System of Preferences under the Trade Act of 1974	March 24, 1975
48	11845	Delegating certain reporting functions to the Director of the Office of Management and Budget	March 24, 1975
49	11846	Administration of the Trade Agreements Program	March 27, 1975
50	11847	Exemption of Walter C. Sauer from mandatory retirement	March 28, 1975
51	11848	Extending the reporting date for the Commission on CIA Activities Within the United States	March 29, 1975
52	11849	Establishing the Collective Bargaining Committee in Construction	April 1, 1975
53	11850	Renunciation of certain uses in war of chemical herbicides and riot control agents	April 8, 1975
54	11851	Delegation of authority to issue regulations limiting imports of certain cheeses	April 10, 1975
55	11852	Creating an emergency board to investigate a dispute between the carriers represented by the National Railway Labor Conference and certain of their employees	April 16, 1975
56	11853	Amending Executive Order No. 11829, relating to the Hopi-Navajo Land Settlement Interagency Committee	April 17, 1975
57	11854	Waiver under the Trade Act of 1974 with respect to the Socialist Republic of Romania	April 24, 1975
58	11855	Membership of the Energy Resources Council	May 1, 1975
59	11856	Amending the Civil Service Rules to except certain positions from the career service	May 7, 1975
60	11857	Amending Executive Order Nos. 11803, 11837, and 11842 to provide authority to increase the number of members of the Presidential Clemency Board	May 7, 1975
61	11858	Foreign investment in the United States	May 7, 1975
62	11859	Inspection of income, estate, and gift tax returns by the Senate Committee on Government Operations	May 7, 1975
63	11860	Establishing the President's Advisory Committee on Refugees	May 19, 1975
64	11861	Placing certain positions in levels IV and V of the Executive Schedule	May 21, 1975
65	11862	Amending Executive Order No. 11652 relating to classification and declassification of national security information	June 11, 1975
66	11863	Withholding of city income or employment taxes by Federal agencies	June 12, 1975
67	11864	Amending Executive Order No. 11861, placing certain positions in levels IV and V of the Executive Schedule	June 13, 1975
68	11865	Amending Executive Order No. 11808 of September 30, 1974 to increase the membership of the Executive Committee of the Economic Policy Board	June 16, 1975
69	11866	Designating the World Intellectual Property Organization (WIPO) as a public international organization entitled to enjoy certain privileges, exemptions, and immunities	June 18, 1975
70	11867	Delegating to the Administrator of General Services authority to issue joint funding regulations	June 19, 1975
71	11868	President's Commission on Olympic Sports	June 19, 1975
72	11869	Exemption of Arthur S. Flemming from mandatory retirement	June 24, 1975
73	11870	Environmental safeguards on activities for animal damage control on Federal lands	July 18, 1975
74	11871	Transferring the SCORE and ACE programs from the ACTION Agency to the Small Business Administration	July 18, 1975
75	11872	Amending Executive Order No. 11861, placing certain positions in levels IV and V of the Executive Schedule	July 21, 1975
76	11873	Amending Executive Order No. 11868, on the President's Commission on Olympic Sports	July 21, 1975
77	11874	Delegation of functions to the Director of the Office of Management and Budget	July 25, 1975
78	11875	Delegating certain functions to the Secretary of Transportation	August 9, 1975
79	11876	Creating an emergency board to investigate a dispute between the carriers represented by the National Railway Labor Conference and certain of their employees	September 2, 1975
80	11877	Amending Executive Order No. 11861, as amended, placing certain positions in levels IV and V of the Executive Schedule	September 2, 1975
81	11878	Assigning responsibilities relating to activities of the Presidential Clemency Board	September 10, 1975
82	11879	Delegating to the Secretary of Commerce functions relating to orders for the provision of chemicals or substances for treatment of water	September 17, 1975
83	11880	Designation of officers of the Department of Commerce to act as Secretary of Commerce	October 2, 1975
84	11881	Delegation of authority to issue regulations with respect to section 459 of the Social Security Act	October 3, 1975
85	11882	Membership of Energy Research and Development Administration on Established River Basin Commissions	October 6, 1975
86	11883	Adjustments of certain rates of pay and allowances	October 6, 1975
87	11884	Prescribing the official coat of arms, seal, and flag of the Vice President of the United States	October 7, 1975
88	11885	Amending Executive Order No. 11861, as amended, placing certain positions in levels IV and V of the Executive Schedule	October 15, 1975
89	11886	Abolishing the Culebra Island naval defensive sea area established by Executive Order No. 8684	October 17, 1975
90	11887	Amending the civil service rules to except certain positions from the career service	November 4, 1975
91	11888	Implementing the Generalized System of Preferences	November 24, 1975
92	11889	Amending Executive Order No. 11832 of January 9, 1975, to extend the existence of the National Commission on the Observance of International Women's Year, 1975	November 25, 1975
93	11890	Amending Executive Order No. 10422, as amended, prescribing procedures for making available to the Secretary General of the United Nations certain information concerning United States citizens employed or being considered for employment on the Secretariat of the United Nations	December 10, 1975
94	11891	Providing for the closing of Government departments and agencies on Friday, December 26, 1975	December 15, 1975
95	11892	Amending Executive Order No. 11746 relating to Federal Regional Councils	December 31, 1975
96	11893	Transferring certain functions from the General Services Administration to the Office of Management and Budget	December 31, 1975

=== 1976 ===
Relative No.	Absolute No.	Title/Description	Date signed
97	11894	Adding to the membership of the East-West Foreign Trade Board	January 3, 1976
98	11895	Delegating authority of the President to designate individuals appointed by the President to receive training	January 5, 1976
99	11896	Establishing the United States Sinai Support Mission	January 13, 1976
100	11897	Amending Executive Order No. 11157 as it relates to special pay while on sea duty or duty at certain places	January 13, 1976
101	11898	Amending Executive Order No. 11861, as amended, placing certain positions in levels IV and V of the Executive Schedule	January 14, 1976
102	11899	Providing for the protection of certain civil service employment rights of Federal personnel who leave Federal employment to be employed by tribal organizations pursuant to the Indian Self-Determination and Education Assistance Act	January 22, 1976
103	11900	Inspection of income, estate and gift tax returns by the Committee on Government Operations, House of Representatives	January 22, 1976
104	11901	Amending Executive Order No. 11491, as amended by Executive Orders 11616, 11636, and 11838 relating to labor-management relations in the Federal service	January 30, 1976
105	11902	Procedures for an export licensing policy as to nuclear materials and equipment	February 2, 1976
106	11903	Membership of the Economic Policy Board	February 2, 1976
107	11904	Establishing the Defense Superior Service Medal	February 6, 1976
108	11905	United States foreign intelligence activities	February 18, 1976
109	11906	Amending the Generalized System of Preferences	February 26, 1976
110	11907	Relating to the administration of the Export Administration Act of 1969	March 1, 1976
111	11908	Amending Executive Order No. 11861, as amended, placing certain positions in levels IV and V of the Executive Schedule	March 18, 1976
112	11909	Exemption of Walter C. Sauer from mandatory retirement	March 31, 1976
113	11910	Delegating legal services functions pursuant to the Disaster Relief Act of 1974	April 13, 1976
114	11911	Preservation of endangered species	April 13, 1976
115	11912	Delegation of authorities relating to energy policy and conservation	April 13, 1976
116	11913	Collection of information for import relief and adjustment assistance	April 26, 1976
117	11914	Nondiscrimination with respect to the handicapped in Federally assisted programs	April 28, 1976
118	11915	Abolishing the Energy Research and Development Advisory Council	May 10, 1976
119	11916	Amending Executive Order No. 11649, regulations governing the seals of the President and the Vice President of the United States	May 28, 1976
120	11917	Amending Executive Order No. 11643 of February 8, 1972, relating to environmental safeguards on activities for animal damage control on Federal lands	May 28, 1976
121	11918	Compensation for damages involving nuclear reactors of United States warships	June 1, 1976
122	11919	Delegating authority of the President to concur in designations of Commissioners, United States Parole Commission	June 9, 1976
123	11920	Establishing executive branch procedures solely for the purpose of facilitating Presidential review of decisions submitted to the President by the Civil Aeronautics Board	June 10, 1976
124	11921	Adjusting emergency preparedness assignments to organizational and functional changes in Federal departments and agencies	June 11, 1976
125	11922	Amending Executive Order No. 11077 of January 22, 1963, entitled "Administration of the Migration and Refugee Assistance Act of 1962"	June 16, 1976
126	11923	The Honorable Francis E. Meloy, Jr. and Robert O. Waring	June 17, 1976
127	11924	Exemption of Arthur S. Flemming from mandatory retirement	June 29, 1976
128	11925	Promotion of Navy and Marine Corps Officers from below the appropriate promotion zone	June 29, 1976
129	11926	The Vice Presidential Service Badge	July 19, 1976
130	11927	Amending Executive Order No. 11861, as amended, placing certain positions in levels IV and V of the Executive Schedule	July 22, 1976
131	11928	Exemption of Harold Council from mandatory retirement	July 26, 1976
132	11929	Incentive pay for enlisted members of the Uniformed Services who are involuntarily removed from aerial flight duties	July 26, 1976
133	11930	Performance by the Federal Energy Office of energy functions of the Federal Energy Administration	July 30, 1976
134	11931	Extending diplomatic privileges and immunities to Permanent Observers to the Organization of American States and to members of their diplomatic staffs	August 3, 1976
135	11932	Classification of certain information and material obtained from advisory bodies created to implement the international energy program	August 4, 1976
136	11933	Termination of the Federal Energy Office	August 25, 1976
137	11934	Amending the Generalized System of Preferences	August 30, 1976
138	11935	Citizenship requirements for Federal employment	September 2, 1976
139	11936	The President's Commission on Olympic Sports	September 8, 1976
140	11937	Relating to appointments to the Quetico-Superior Committee	September 10, 1976
141	11938	Relating to adjustment of cost of living allowances and post deferentials	September 29, 1976
142	11939	Basic allowances for quarters	September 30, 1976
143	11940	Continuing the regulation of exports	September 30, 1976
144	11941	Adjustments of certain rates of pay and allowances	October 1, 1976
145	11942	Exemption of Ashton C. Barrett from mandatory retirement	October 22, 1976
146	11943	Amendment of adjustments of certain rates of pay and allowances	October 25, 1976
147	11944	Authorizing delegation of authority to the Secretary of the Treasury with respect to the Northern Mariana Islands	October 25, 1976
148	11945	Physical fitness and sports	October 25, 1976
149	11946	White House fellowships	October 25, 1976
150	11947	Reports and investigations relating to the administration of the Trade Agreements Program	November 8, 1976
151	11948	Continuance of certain Federal advisory committees	December 20, 1976
152	11949	Economic impact statements	December 31, 1976

=== 1977 ===
Relative No.	Absolute No.	Title/Description	Date signed
153	11950	Conforming the Central Intelligence Agency and Civil Service Retirement and Disability Systems with respect to cost of living adjustments	January 6, 1977
154	11951	Relating to the Arrangement Regarding International Trade in Textiles	January 6, 1977
155	11952	Conforming the Foreign Service and Civil Service Retirement and Disability Systems	January 7, 1977
156	11953	Assigning emergency preparedness functions to the Energy Research and Development Administration and Nuclear Regulatory Commission	January 7, 1977
157	11954	Federal property review	January 7, 1977
158	11955	Permitting certain qualified employees of the National Aeronautics and Space Administration to be given career or career-conditional appointments	January 10, 1977
159	11956	Relating to voluntary agreements	January 13, 1977
160	11957	Designation of certain officers to act as Secretary of Agriculture	January 13, 1977
161	11958	Administration of arms export controls	January 18, 1977
162	11959	Administration of foreign assistance and related functions	January 18, 1977
163	11960	Amending the Generalized System of Preferences	January 19, 1977
164	11961	Administration of the International Investment Survey Act of 1976	January 19, 1977
165	11962	Establishing the President's Advisory Board on International Investment	January 19, 1977
166	11963	Delegating reporting functions under the Agricultural Trade Development and Assistance Act of 1954, as amended	January 19, 1977
167	11964	Implementation of the Convention on the International Regulations for Preventing Collisions at Sea, 1972	January 19, 1977
168	11965	Establishing the Humanitarian Service Medal	January 19, 1977
169	11966	Designating certain public international organizations entitled to enjoy certain privileges, exemptions, and immunities	January 19, 1977

== See also ==
- List of executive actions by Richard Nixon, EO #11452–11797 (1969–1974)
- List of executive actions by Jimmy Carter, EO #11967–12286 (1977–1981)
