= FBI Index =

System used to track American citizens and other people

Index entry of Martin Luther King Jr.

The FBI Indexes, or Index List, was a system used to track American citizens and other people by the Federal Bureau of Investigation (FBI) before the adoption of computerized databases. The Index List was originally made of paper index cards, first compiled by J. Edgar Hoover at the Bureau of Investigations before he was appointed director of the FBI. The Index List was used to track U.S. citizens and others believed by the FBI to be dangerous to national security, and was subdivided into various divisions which generally were rated based on different classes of danger the subject was thought to represent.

== General Intelligence Division ==
In 1919, during the First Red Scare, William J. Flynn of the Bureau of Investigation appointed J. Edgar Hoover chief of the General Intelligence Division (GID). Hoover used his experience working as a library clerk at the Library of Congress to create an index tracking system which used extensive cross-referencing. When he began his work, Hoover stated that the BOI's files were of "practically little or no use" to assist in deportation cases, and that finding a single case file could take up to three or four hours. He responded by creating a classification system called the "Editorial File System". By the end of his first year, Hoover noted that the time necessary to locate a given document shrank to two minutes at a maximum.

The GID took files from the Bureau of Investigations (later renamed the Federal Bureau of Investigation) and 'systematized' them via index cards. The cards covered 150,000 people. By 1939, Hoover had more than 10 million people 'Indexed' in the FBI's domestic file system.

Although the GID was terminated in 1924 after objections from people such as William J. Donovan who questioned its constitutionality, Hoover and the FBI continued to expand the Index system for use by the agency, by Hoover, and by Hoover's political associates well into the 1970s. Presently, the Index files covering an unknown number of Americans are still accessible by the FBI and its 29 field offices.

Titles of the evolving Index catalogs include: the Custodial Index, which included citizens or aliens with German, Italian and Communist sympathies, that could be held in internment camps during World War II; the Security Index, for influential people to be "arrested and held" in case of a national emergency; The Communist Index; The Agitator Index; Sexual Deviant Index; and The Administrative Index, which compiled several earlier indexes.

Even though a complete list of Index titles is currently unavailable, Hoover and the FBI used their Index system to catalog Native American and African American liberation activists during the 1960s and 1970s, as well as Vietnam War protesters and some other college students.

== Custodial Detention Index ==
The Custodial Detention Index (CDI), or Custodial Detention List was formed in 1939–1941, as part of a program named variously the "Custodial Detention Program" or "Alien Enemy Control".

J. Edgar Hoover described it as having come from his resurrected General Intelligence Division in Washington. According to Hoover, it created large numbers of files on "individuals, groups, and organizations engaged in subversive activities", including espionage, and enabled the Bureau to immediately identify potential threats. Congressman Vito Marcantonio called it "terror by index cards". Senator George W. Norris complained as well.

The Custodial Detention Index was a list of suspects and potential subversives, classified as "A", "B" and "C"; the ones classified as "A" were destined to be arrested immediately and interned at the beginning of war. Category A were officials of Axis-related organizations, category B were members deemed "less dangerous" and category C were sympathizers. The actual assignment of the categories was, however, based on the perceived individual commitment to the person's native country, rather than the actual potential to cause harm; officers of cultural organizations could be classified as "A".

The program involved creation of individual dossiers from information obtained secretly, including unsubstantiated data and in some cases, even hearsay and unsolicited telephone tips, and information acquired without judicial warrants by mail covers and interception of mail, wiretaps and covert searches. While the program targeted primarily Japanese, Italian, and German "enemy aliens", it also included some native-born American citizens. The program was operated without Congress-approved legal authority, without judicial oversight and in excess of the legal authority of the FBI. A person against which an accusation was made was investigated and eventually placed on the index; it was not removed until the person died. According to the press releases at the beginning of the war, one of the purposes of the program was to demonstrate the diligence and vigilance of the government by following, arresting and isolating a previously identified group of people with allegedly documented sympathies for Axis powers and potential for espionage or fifth column activities. The list was later used for Japanese American internment after Roosevelt's Executive Order 9066. Although some say Hoover actually opposed those measures, Hoover and the FBI created the list from which 110,000 people were interned, 70,000 of which were American-born.

Attorney General Francis Biddle, upon learning of the Index in 1941, termed it "dangerous, illegal" and ordered its end. However, J. Edgar Hoover simply renamed it the Security Index, and told his people not to mention it.

Internal Security Act of 1950 contained an emergency detention statute, giving the President the authority to apprehend and detain "each person as to whom there is a reasonable ground to believe that such person probably will engage in, or probably will conspire with others to engage in, acts of espionage or sabotage." Therefore, FBI began in the early 1950s to compile a secret list, known as the “Security Index,” of American citizens who were “targeted for detention” in a national emergency. At its peak it contained about 15,000 names, including virtually all known members of the US Communist party. Although the detention provisions of the Internal Security Act were repealed in 1971, the index was still reportedly being maintained by the FBI, in anticipation of possible reinstatement of the detention provisions.

== Security Index/Reserve Index ==
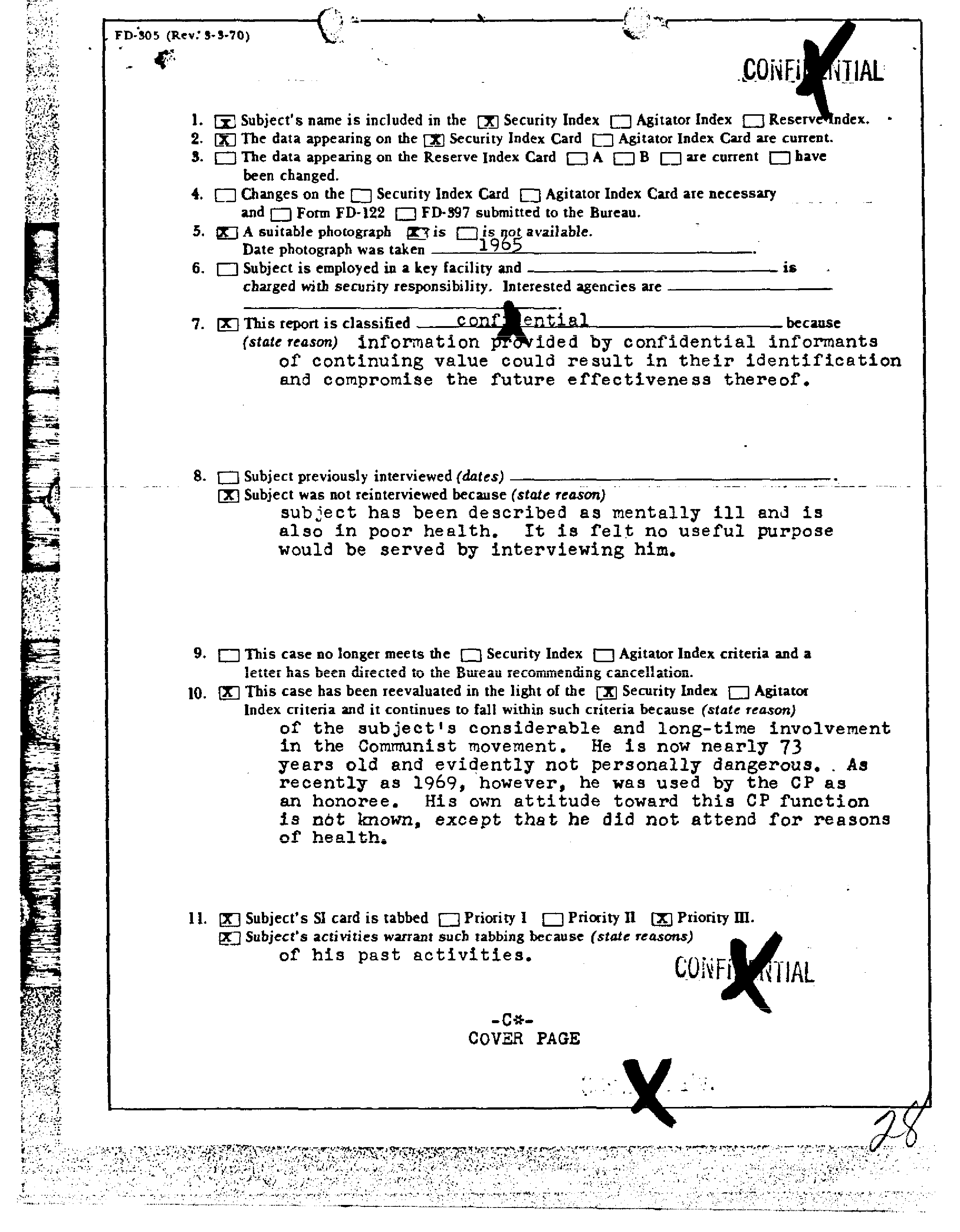
American singer Paul Robeson's index card update form with check marks for which Index and Section

The Security Index pertained to the FBI list of dangerous people who might commit acts inimical to the national defense and public safety of the United States, in the eyes of the FBI, in time of emergency. The list specified who could be arrested upon the order of a U.S. president invoking the Emergency Detention Program. The Reserve Index, on the other hand, listed all left-wingers and people suspected of being a Communist. By 1950s, for instance, there were 5,000 names on the Security Index, while the Reserve Index had 50,000 in the Chicago field office. A person listed in the Reserve Index could be transferred to the Security Index if such individual posed a threat to U.S. interests in a period of national emergency. A difference between these indices involved their color scheme. The files of those of the Security Index were all in white while the Reserve Index varied in colors depending on the occupation of the subject.

Prominent figures listed in the Reserve Index include Martin Luther King. The FBI had been monitoring his activities with the Southern Christian Leadership Conference since 1957 and by 1962, he was finally listed in the FBI index due to the involvement of two of his advisers with the U.S. Communist Party, although he failed to meet the criteria for inclusion in the Security Index.

The Security Index itself was merged with the Agitator Index and the Communist Index. Renamed the Reserve Index in 1960, this index included a Section A for teachers, doctors, lawyers, entertainers, and other people considered influential and not politically conservative. Hoover had King added to the Reserve Index, Section A, in retaliation for his civil rights work and worldwide popularity.

Renamed again to the Administrative Index (ADEX) in 1971 and discontinued during 1978, the records are still kept as inactive at FBI headquarters and 29 field offices.

== Rabble Rouser Index ==
Rabble Rouser Index entry of Jesse Benjamin Stoner from 1967 notes he is suspected of bombing multiple black churches and schools.

Records of names added to the Rabble Rouser Index are available online from The Vault, which hosts the FBI's FOIA Library, as part of FBI case file 157-HQ-7782. The Internet Archive maintains a copy of this information with additional explanatory material. In addition, a repository of FBI files obtained under FOIA request, including the Rabble Rouser Index, is maintained at the National Archives.

=== People ===
Notable people include:

- Saul Alinsky – political theorist
- James H. Madole – National Renaissance Party
- Floyd McKissick – SNCC
- Jerry Rubin – anti-war activist
- Adam Clayton Powell Jr. – NY Congressman
- John A. Wilson – Washington DC council member
- Howard Zinn – historian and philosopher

=== Categories ===
Notable categories listed on FBI form FD-307 include:

- American Nazi Party
- Anti-Vietnam
- Black Nationalist
- Black Panther Party
- Communist Party USA
- Congress of Racial Equality
- KKK organization
- Latin Americans
- Minutemen
- Nation of Islam
- National States' Rights Party
- Progressive Labor Party
- Independence movement in Puerto Rico
- Revolutionary Action Movement
- Southern Christian Leadership Conference
- Students for a Democratic Society
- Student Non-Violent Coordinating Committee
- Socialist Workers Party
- Workers World Party

== Administrative Index ==
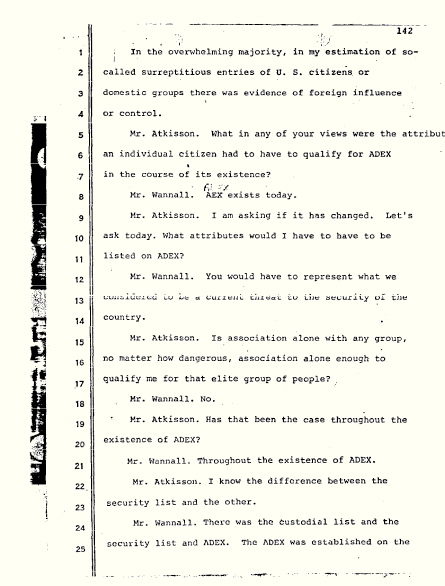
FBI rep describing ADEX, 1975

ADEX, or Administrative Index, lasted from 1971 to January 1978. It integrated the Security Index, the Agitator Index, and the Reserve Index. It was used to track people "considered to be a threat to the security of the country". ADEX had four 'categories'.

An illustrative example of these files and the rationale for categorization is the case of historian Howard Zinn, a noted government critic. In his FBI files, there are two separate pages in which an agent says he should be in category III:

He has been a member of the Communist Party, 1949–1953. A chief critic of the United States Government policies. A familiar figure at anti-war demonstrations up to 1972. Organized a protest rally to protest serious indictments against Father Berrigan and other members of the East Coast Conspiracy in the Summer of 1971

It is recommended that subject be included in ADEX, Category III, because he has participated in activities of revolutionary organizations within the last five years as evidenced by overt acts and statements established through reliable informants

Singer Paul Robeson's name was also on ADEX as Category III: "because of his long time close contact with CPUSA leaders. He was honored by the CP as recently as 1969".

== See also ==
- NSA projects:
  - SHAMROCK – 1945; telegraphic data
  - MINARET – 1962; electronic communications containing names of predesignated U.S. citizens
  - ECHELON – 1971; global surveillance Five Eyes collaboration
  - Turbulence – 2005; Internet, cell phone, e-mail; successor to Trailblazer and Thinthread
  - PRISM – 2007; FISA warrants to big data providers
- FBI projects:
  - FBI Silvermaster Files – from the 1940s
  - Investigative Data Warehouse – late 20th century

Related topics:

- Blacklist
- Computer-Assisted Passenger Prescreening System
- DCSNet
- German American internment
- Hollywood blacklist
- Italian American internment
- Interpol Terrorism Watch List
- Japanese American internment
- Main Core
- No Fly List
- Rex 84
- Secondary Security Screening Selection
- Specially Designated Nationals and Blocked Persons List
- Terrorist Identities Datamart Environment
- Terrorist Screening Database
