= Registered Traveler =

Public/private partnership in the US

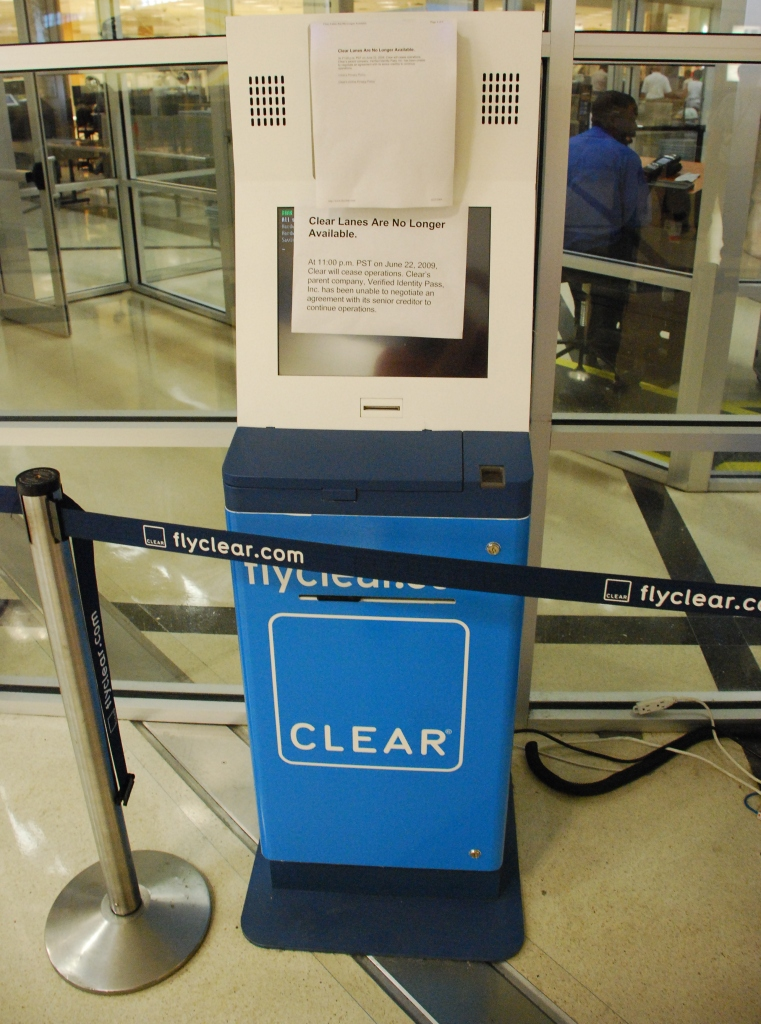
A Clear kiosk at Hartsfield-Jackson Atlanta International Airport in 2009

A registered traveler is a person qualified through an airline passenger security assessment system in the United States air travel industry. Such programs were initially tested in 2005. Registered traveler programs are currently in operation in various airports around the country and are administered by TTAC, the Transportation Security Administration (TSA) office responsible for Secure Flight, the replacement for the Computer Assisted Passenger Prescreening System (CAPPS) and the canceled CAPPS II counter-terrorism system.

Registered Traveler is a public and private partnership between the TSA and the Registered Traveler Interoperability Consortium (RTIC), providing rules and standards for private enrollment providers that sign up participants. The largest registered traveler program is called Clear and is operated by Clear Secure, Inc. The Clear Access Clearance Service is currently operating at 60 airports, airports, stadiums, and other venues nationwide as of January 2020.

== Overview ==
The program seeks to identify passengers who pose a minimal security risk and then provide those passengers with an improvised security checkpoint process. Passengers will voluntarily pay a fee and submit to a background check to become registered travelers. Passengers who pass the background check will be issued a smartcard credential for use at the security checkpoints of airports that participate in the program. Registered travelers will have access to a reserved security lane and will experience a shorter wait at the security checkpoint. Other benefits, such as allowing registered travelers to keep their coats and shoes on and their laptops in their bags, have also been discussed. Any U.S. citizen or lawful permanent resident over the age of 18 can apply for membership, as can minors over the age of 12 with parental or guardian sponsorship.

In order to prevent a terrorist with a clean background from compromising the system, the TSA requires that registered travelers undergo the normal TSA screening (baggage x-ray and personal metal detector) at the RT kiosk checkpoint. Additionally, registered travelers are not exempt from random secondary screening and may not bring prohibited items into secure areas of terminals.

== Airports ==
These airports operated the Clear Registered Traveler program until June 2009, and currently other Registered Traveler programs:

- Albany International Airport (ALB)
- Cincinnati/Northern Kentucky International Airport (CVG), Terminal 3
- Denver International Airport (DEN)
- Gulfport–Biloxi International Airport (GPT)
- Hartsfield–Jackson Atlanta International Airport (ATL)
- Indianapolis International Airport (IND)
- Jacksonville International Airport (JAX)
- LaGuardia Airport (LGA), Delta/Northwest Terminal and B gates in the Central Terminal
- Clinton National Airport (LIT)
- Logan International Airport (BOS)
- John F. Kennedy International Airport (JFK), Terminals 1, 4, and 7
- Newark Liberty International Airport, Terminal B (EWR)
- San Jose International Airport (SJC), Terminal A and C
- Oakland International Airport (OAK)
- Orlando International Airport (MCO)
- Reno–Tahoe International Airport (RNO)
- Ronald Reagan Washington National Airport (DCA)
- San Francisco International Airport (SFO), Terminals 1 and 3
- Salt Lake City International Airport (SLC)
- Dulles International Airport (IAD)
- Westchester County Airport (HPN)

These airports are currently implementing RT programs:

- Toronto Pearson International Airport (YYZ)

These airports intend to implement RT programs in the near future:

The following airports have expressed interest and/or have requested TSA approval for the RT program:

- Baltimore/Washington International Airport (BWI)
- Birmingham–Shuttlesworth International Airport (BHM)
- Midway International Airport (MDW)
- Huntsville International Airport (HSV)
- Los Angeles International Airport (LAX)
- O'Hare International Airport (ORD)
- Pittsburgh International Airport (PIT)
- Springfield–Branson National Airport (SGF)
- Ted Stevens Anchorage International Airport (ANC)

== Programs ==
The Registered Traveler programs are interoperable; someone who is registered with one RT program can participate in programs operated by other providers.

=== Clear ===
Clear, operated by Verified Identity Pass, was the largest registered traveler program participant with almost 200,000 members. Established by Court TV founder Steven Brill and current Aware CEO Ajay Amlani, it had programs at airports in Albany, Cincinnati, Denver, Washington, D.C. (Dulles and Reagan), Indianapolis, Little Rock, New York (LaGuardia and JFK), Newark, Oakland, Orlando, Salt Lake City, San Jose, San Francisco, and Westchester County.

On July 26, 2008, a laptop containing the names, addresses, birth dates, driver's license numbers, and passport information of 33,000 Clear customers was reported stolen from a secure room at San Francisco International Airport. The information was on an unencrypted laptop (in contravention of TSA rules), although it had by two levels of password protection. TSA officials ordered Clear to inform affected customers, suspend enrollment of new customers, cease the use of unencrypted computers, and secure devices until encryption could be installed as required by TSA rules. Verified Identity Pass had to submit an independent audit of its systems to the TSA before the company could register new customers. On August 5, 2008, the laptop was found in the room where it went missing. Officials were investigating whether personal data was accessed and the circumstances of its reappearance.

On July 6, 2009, two law firms filed a class action lawsuit on behalf of customers of Clear's parent company, Verified Identity Pass. The lawsuit was filed in the U.S. District Court for the Southern District of New York against Verified Identity Pass Inc. by Schneider Wallace Cottrell Brayton Konecky LLP and Kaplan Fox. It claimed that by ceasing operations and not offering refunds, VIP committed conversion, fraud, breach of contract, negligence, and unjust enrichment. Additional lawsuits focused on demanding the return or destruction of personal information, Social Security and credit-card numbers, fingerprints, and iris scans and refunding membership fees.

On April 16, 2010, Judge Stuart M. Bernstein of the U.S. Bankruptcy Court in Manhattan granted approval to Alclear to purchase Clear after it outbid Henry Inc. Verified Identity Pass was purchased by Alclear on May 3, 2010. Alclear brought Clear back and honored the time left on Clear's original customers whose membership may have been terminated before the end of their contracts. In November 2010, Clear re-opened at the Denver and Orlando airports. In February 2018, Clear was operational in nineteen cities.

=== iQueue ===
FLO Corporation has partnered with Cogent and iQueue to deliver RT solutions and services. They expected to bring back the Registered Traveler program in the "Fall of 2010," starting with Indianapolis International Airport, with further expansions planned after. The website still exists (flyiqueue.com), but the registered traveler enrollment is not as yet operational.

==== FLO ====
The FLO Corporation, in conjunction with FLO Alliance partners, provides biometric identification technologies and credentialing processes for use in airports in accordance with the Registered Traveler program. Final enrollment centers are located in the Washington, D.C. area, or by on-location appointment for corporate accounts.

==== RtGo ====
RtGo was operated by Unisys Corporation (it had been bought out by FLO and was being operated by IRAM Associates). Membership was $100 per year, with the option to prepay for up to 5 years. Shortly after the buyout, the company went out of business and was shut down in July 2009.

=== Preferred Traveler ===
The Preferred Traveler program is run by Vigilant Solutions, a Jacksonville Beach-based company. The company's program differentiates itself by adding a suite of value-added services for the traveler.

== Identifying information ==
Passengers who participate in this system must first provide personal biographical information including name, address, phone number, citizenship status, and previous addresses, along with other information. The biographical information will be collected by a commercial Registered Traveler service provider. The biographical portion of the enrollment may be accomplished via a secure website. Next, the applicant will proceed to the biometric phase of the enrollment process. During biometric enrollment applicants will present identification documents and fingerprints. Applicants may also choose to have an image of their iris taken if they wish to use an iris image as an alternative to a fingerprint scan at the security checkpoint. The iris image is non-invasive to the eye. Once the biometric enrollment is complete, the service provider submits the collected data to the TSA which performs a Security Threat Assessment (STA) of the applicant. If the assessment indicates that the applicant is not suspected of posing a risk to aviation security, the TSA will return an approved STA result to the service provider. The service provider will then provide the passenger with a Registered Traveler card. The card will be a smartcard, containing biometric information to prevent the card from being used by unauthorized persons. This card will then be inserted into a verification kiosk at the special checkpoints, which will verify the passenger's biometrics (fingerprint or iris scan) and acknowledge membership and clearance to proceed to RT screening.

== Controversy ==
=== Privacy ===
This system, like the related Secure Flight, has come under fire for its privacy implications although less so because Registered Traveler unlike Secure Flight is voluntary. The potential effectiveness has also been questioned. On the privacy front Registered Traveler collects far more information than Secure Flight including biometrics. While supporters assert that this program is voluntary, critics assert that RT's extensive background checks will be misused. The privacy safeguards and rules can be found in the RTIC specification and the TSA RT Privacy Impact Assessment (PIA). Many airports and airlines already offer access to shorter "priority" security lines to first-class or other status travelers without requiring any background checks.

=== Effectiveness ===
Similar to the concerns raised about CAPPS and CAPPS II, critics point out that any program designed to exclude certain passengers from scrutiny will provide a backdoor for potential terrorists, since they would likely seek Registered Traveler status. This criticism draws on the 9/11 Commission's finding that nine of the 19 hijackers involved in the September 11, 2001 attacks were flagged by the CAPPS I system but were not intercepted, because security was focused on luggage bombs. However, those participating in the Registered Traveler Program currently pass through the same security checkpoints and are screened the same as any other individual, the main difference being RT members enjoy a much shorter wait before screening. Currently, RT programs do not offer a reduced security check, but their announced plans indicate they intend to offer this if airport officials allow it.

=== Fairness ===
Because the Registered Travelers Program, in its current form, does not exempt members from any of the security checks of the TSA, it is often criticized as merely being a method by which frequent travelers can pay an annual fee to a private company in order to be permitted to move to the head of the TSA line and not wait their turn along with less frequent travelers. Since the TSA lines are a government program (funded by equal payments on tickets of frequent travelers and non-travelers), this strikes many as being unfair to less frequent travelers.

== See also ==
- CATSA
- No Fly List
