= No Fly List =

US federal government list of individuals banned from US commercial flights

The No Fly List, maintained by the United States federal government's Threat Screening Center (TSC), is one of several lists used by the Transportation Security Administration's Secure Flight program and airlines to decide who to allow to board airline flights. The TSC's No Fly List is a list of people who are prohibited from boarding commercial aircraft for travel within, into, or out of the United States. This list has also been used to divert aircraft away from U.S. airspace that do not have start- or end-point destinations within the United States. The number of people on the list rises and falls according to threat and intelligence reporting. There were reportedly 16,000 names on the list in 2011, 21,000 in 2012, and 47,000 in 2013.

The list—along with Secondary Security Screening Selection, which tags would-be passengers for extra inspection—was created after the September 11 attacks of 2001. The No Fly List, the Selectee List, and the Terrorist Watch List were created by the George W. Bush administration and has continued through all subsequent presidential administrations. Former U.S. Senate Intelligence Committee chair Dianne Feinstein said in May 2010: "The no-fly list itself is one of our best lines of defense." However, the list has been criticized on civil liberties and due process grounds, due in part to its potential for ethnic, religious, economic, political, or racial profiling and discrimination. It has raised concerns about privacy and government secrecy and has been criticized as prone to false positives.

The No Fly List is different from the Terrorist Watch List, a much longer list of people said to be suspected of some involvement with terrorism. As of June 2014, the Terrorist Watch List is estimated to contain over 2,484,446 records, consisting of 1,877,139 individual identities.

== History ==
Before the attacks of September 11, 2001, the U.S. federal government had a list of 16 people deemed "no transport" because they "presented a specific known or suspected threat to aviation." The list grew in the immediate aftermath of the September 11 attacks, reaching more than 400 names by November 2001, when responsibility for keeping it was transferred to the Federal Aviation Administration (FAA). In mid-December 2001, two lists were created: the "No Fly List" of 594 people to be denied air transport, and the "Selectee" list of 365 people who were to be more carefully searched at airports. By 2002, the two lists combined contained over a thousand names, and by April 2005 contained about 70,000 names. For the first two and a half years of the program, the Federal Bureau of Investigation (FBI) and Transportation Security Administration (TSA) denied that the program existed.

In 2004, then-U.S. Senator Edward Kennedy was denied boarding a flight because his name was similar to an alias found on the No Fly List. Laura K. Donohue would later write in The Cost of Counterterrorism: Power, Politics, and Liberty that "antiwar activists, such as Jan Adams and Rebecca Gordan, and political opponents of the Bush administration, such as Senator Edward Kennedy and civil rights attorney David Cole, found themselves included." In June 2016, Timothy Healy, the former director of the FBI Terrorist Screening Center, disputed the claim that Kennedy had ever appeared on the list, saying that another person with a similar name—who had accidentally tried to bring ammunition on to a plane—was placed on an airline's watch list and Kennedy was mistakenly detained by the airline, not based on the No Fly List. In October 2006, CBS News' 60 Minutes reported on the program after it obtained a March 2006 copy of the list containing 44,000 names.

Many individuals were "caught in the system" as a result of sharing the exact or similar name of another person on the list; TSA officials said that, as of November 2005, 30,000 people in 2005 had complained that their names were matched to a name on the list via the name matching software used by airlines. In January 2006, the FBI and ACLU settled a federal lawsuit, Gordon v. FBI, brought by Gordon and Adams under the Freedom of Information Act in order to obtain information about how names were added to the list. Under the settlement, the government paid $200,000 in the plaintiffs' attorneys' fees. A separate suit was brought as a class action "filed by people caught in the name game." In response, "TSA created an ombudsman process, whereby individuals now can download and print out a Passenger Identity Verification Form and mail it, along with certain notarized documents, to the TSA 'so the agency can differentiate the individual from others who may be on the list.'"

In April 2007, the U.S. federal government's "terrorist watch list" administered by the Terrorist Screening Center (which is managed principally by the FBI) contained 700,000 records. A year later, the ACLU estimated the list to have grown to over 1,000,000 names and to be continually expanding. However, according to Homeland Security secretary Michael Chertoff, in October 2008 the No Fly List contained only 2,500 names, with an additional 16,000 "selectees" who "represent a less specific security threat and receive extra scrutiny, but are allowed to fly."

As of 2011, the list contained about 10,000 names. In 2012, the list more than doubled in size, to about 21,000 names as the list now included people who were a threat to security outside aviation. In August 2013, a leak revealed that more than 47,000 people were on the list. In 2016, California Senator Dianne Feinstein disclosed that 81,000 people were on the No Fly List.

There is a huge, secretive US anti-terrorism database for Canada specifically, "Tuscan" (Tipoff US/Canada), revealed by Canada's access to information system. The database is used by both the US and Canada, and applies to all borders, not just airports. It is believed to contain information on about 680,000 people thought to be linked with terrorism. The list was created in 1997 as a consular aid. It was repurposed and expanded after 9/11, and again in 2016. The names in Tuscan come from the US Terrorist Identities Datamart Environment (Tide), which is vetted by the FBI's Terrorist Screening Center and populates various US traveller databases, Canada's Tuscan and the Australian equivalent, "Tactics".

== Weapons purchases by listed persons (No Fly No Buy) ==
In a 2010 report, the Government Accountability Office noted that "Membership in a terrorist organization does not prohibit a person from possessing firearms or explosives under current federal law," and individuals on the No Fly List are not barred from purchasing guns. According to GAO data, between 2004 and 2010, people on terrorism watch lists—including the No Fly List as well as other separate lists—attempted to buy guns and explosives more than 1,400 times, and succeeded 1,321 times (more than 90% of cases).

Senator Frank Lautenberg of New Jersey repeatedly introduced legislation to bar individuals on the terror watch lists (such as the No Fly List) from buying firearms or explosives, but these efforts have not succeeded. Senator Dianne Feinstein of California revived the legislation after the November 2015 Paris attacks and President Barack Obama has called for such legislation to be approved.

Republicans in Congress such as Senate Homeland Security Committee chair Ron Johnson and former Speaker of the House Paul Ryan oppose this measure, citing due process concerns and efficacy, respectively. Republicans have blocked attempts by Democrats to attach these provisions to Republican-backed measures.

The American Civil Liberties Union has voiced opposition to barring weapons sales to individuals listed on the current form of the No Fly List, stating that: "There is no constitutional bar to reasonable regulation of guns, and the No Fly List could serve as one tool for it, but only with major reform." Specifically, the ACLU's position is that the government's current redress process—the procedure by which listed individuals can petition for removal from the list—does not meet the requirements of the Constitution's Due Process Clause because the process does not "provide meaningful notice of the reasons our clients are blacklisted, the basis for those reasons, and a hearing before a neutral decision-maker."

In December 2015, Feinstein's amendment to bar individuals on the terror watch list from purchasing firearms failed in the Senate on a 45-54 vote. Senate Majority Whip John Cornyn of Texas put forth a competing proposal to "give the attorney general the power to impose a 72-hour delay for individuals on the terror watch list seeking to purchase a gun and it could become a permanent ban if a judge determines there is probable cause during that time window." The measure, too, failed, on a 55-45 vote (60 votes were required to proceed). The votes on both the Feinstein measure and the Cornyn measure were largely along party lines.

== Vulnerabilities ==
With the aim of preventing individuals on the No Fly List from flying in commercial airliners, U.S. airports require all passengers to show valid picture ID (e.g. a passport or driver's license) along with their boarding pass before entering the boarding terminal. At this checkpoint, the name on the ID is matched to that on the boarding pass, but is not recorded. In order to be effective, this practice must assume that 1.) the ticket was bought under the passenger's real name (at which point the name was recorded and checked against the No Fly List), 2.) the boarding pass shown is real, and 3.) the ID shown is real. However, the rise of print-at-home boarding passes, which can be easily forged, allows a potential attacker to buy a ticket under someone else's name, to go into the boarding terminal using a real ID and a fake boarding pass, and then to fly on the ticket that has someone else's name on it. Additionally, a 2007 investigation showed that obviously false IDs could be used when claiming a boarding pass and entering the departures terminal, so a person on the No Fly List can simply travel under a different name.

=== False positives ===
A "false positive" occurs when a passenger who is not on the No Fly List has a name that matches or is similar to a name on the list. False positive passengers will not be allowed to board a flight unless they can differentiate themselves from the actual person on the list, usually by presenting ID showing their middle name or date of birth. In some cases, false positive passengers have been denied boarding or have missed flights because they could not easily prove that they were not the person on the No Fly List.

==== Notable cases ====
False positives and abuses that have been in the news include:

- Numerous children (including many under the age of five, and some under the age of one) have generated false positives.
- Daniel Brown, a United States Marine Corps reservist returning from Iraq, was prevented from boarding a flight home in April 2006 because his name matched one on the No Fly List.
- David Fathi, an attorney for the ACLU of Iranian descent and a plaintiff in an ACLU lawsuit, has been arrested and detained because his name was on the No Fly List.
- Asif Iqbal, a management consultant and legal resident of the United States born in Pakistan, plans to sue the U.S. government because he is regularly detained when he tries to fly. He has the same name as a former Guantanamo detainee. Iqbal's work requires a lot of travel, and, even though the Guantanamo detainee has been released, his name remains on the No Fly List, and Iqbal the software consultant experiences frequent, unpredictable delays and missed flights. He is pushing for a photo ID and birthdate matching system, in addition to the current system of checking names.
- Robert J. Johnson, a surgeon and a former lieutenant colonel in the U.S. Army, was told in 2006 that he was on the list, although he had had no problem in flying the month before. Johnson was running as a Democrat against U.S. Representative John McHugh, a Republican. Johnson wondered whether he was on the list because of his opposition to the Iraq War. He stated, "This could just be a government screw-up, but I don't know, and they won't tell me." Later, a 60 Minutes report brought together 12 men named Robert Johnson, all of whom had experienced problems in airports with being pulled aside and interrogated. The report suggested that the individual whose name was intended to be on the list was most likely the Robert Johnson who had been convicted of plotting to bomb a movie theater and a Hindu temple in Toronto.
- In August 2004, Senator Ted Kennedy told a Senate Judiciary Committee discussing the No Fly List that he had appeared on the list and had been repeatedly delayed at airports. He said it had taken him three weeks of appeals directly to Homeland Security Secretary Tom Ridge to have him removed from the list. Kennedy said he was eventually told that the name "T Kennedy" was added to the list because it was once used as an alias of a suspected terrorist. There are an estimated 7,000 American men whose legal names correspond to "T Kennedy". (Senator Kennedy, whose first name was Edward and for whom "Ted" was only a nickname, would not have been one of them.) Recognizing that as a U.S. Senator he was in a privileged position of being able to contact Ridge, Kennedy said of "ordinary citizens": "How are they going to be able to get to be treated fairly and not have their rights abused?" Former mayor of New York City Rudy Giuliani pointed to this incident as an example of the necessity to "rethink aviation security" in an essay on homeland security published while he was seeking the Republican nomination for the 2008 presidential election.
- The late U.S. Representative, former Freedom Rider, and former Chairman of Student Nonviolent Coordinating Committee, John Lewis, was stopped many times in his life.
- Canadian journalist Patrick Martin has been frequently interrogated while traveling, because of a suspicious individual, believed to be a former Provisional Irish Republican Army bombmaker, with the same name.
- Walter F. Murphy, McCormick Professor of Jurisprudence at Princeton, reported that the following exchange took place at Newark on 1 March 2007, where he was denied a boarding pass "because I [Murphy] was on the Terrorist Watch list." The airline employee asked, "Have you been in any peace marches? We ban a lot of people from flying because of that." Replied Murphy, "I explained that I had not so marched but had, in September 2006, given a lecture at Princeton, televised and put on the web, highly critical of George Bush for his many violations of the constitution." To which the airline employee responded, "That'll do it."
- David Nelson, the actor best known for his role on The Adventures of Ozzie and Harriet, is among various persons named David Nelson who have been stopped at airports because their name apparently appears on the list.
- Jesselyn Radack, a former United States Department of Justice ethics adviser who argued that John Walker Lindh was entitled to an attorney, was placed on the No Fly List as part of what she believes to be a reprisal for her whistle-blowing.
- In September 2004, former pop singer Cat Stevens (who converted to Islam and changed his name to "Yusuf Islam" in 1978) was denied entry into the U.S. after his name was found on the list.
- In February 2006, U.S. Senator Ted Stevens stated in a committee hearing that his wife Catherine had been subjected to questioning at an airport as to whether she was Cat Stevens due to the similarity of their names.
- U.S. Representative Don Young, the third-most senior Republican in the House, was flagged in 2004 after he was mistaken for a "Donald Lee Young".
- Some members of the Federal Air Marshal Service have been denied boarding on flights that they were assigned to protect because their names matched those of persons on the No Fly List.
- In August 2008, CNN reported that an airline captain and retired brigadier general of the U.S. Air National Guard has had numerous encounters with security officials when attempting to pilot his own plane.
- After frequently being detained for questioning at airport terminals, a Canadian businessman changed his name to avoid being delayed every time he took a flight.
- In October 2008, the Washington Post reported that Maryland State Police classified 53 nonviolent political activists as terrorists, and entered their names and personal information into state and federal databases, with labels indicating that they were terror suspects. The protest groups were also entered as terrorist organizations. During a hearing, it was revealed that these individuals and organizations had been placed in the databases because of a surveillance operation that targeted opponents of the death penalty and the Iraq War.
- In April 2009, TSA refused to allow an Air France flight from Paris to Mexico to cross U.S. airspace because it was carrying Colombian journalist Hernando Calvo Ospina. Air France did not send the passenger manifest to the U.S. authorities; they did however send it to Mexico who forwarded it to the U.S.
- On August 19, 2009, Air France flight AF-438 was not allowed to cross into U.S. airspace because of the presence on board of one Paul-Emile Dupret, a human rights activist and civil servant at the European Parliament.
- Bollywood actor Shah Rukh Khan was held for extensive questioning by U.S. Immigration and Customs officials in August 2009 because, as he reported, "his name came up on a computer alert list." Customs officials claimed that he "was questioned as part of a routine process that took 66 minutes." Khan was visiting the United States to promote his film My Name Is Khan, which concerns racial profiling of Muslims in the United States.
- In June 2010, The New York Times reported that Yahya Wehelie, a 26-year-old Muslim American man, was being prevented from returning to the United States, and was stranded in Cairo. Despite Wehelie's offer to FBI agents to allow them to accompany him on the plane, while shackled, he was not permitted to fly. The ACLU has argued that this constitutes banishment. In July 2010, Wehelie was permitted to fly to New York under a federal waiver.
- A U.S. citizen, stranded in Colombia after being placed on the No Fly List as a result of having studied in Yemen, sought to re-enter the U.S. through Mexico but was returned to Colombia by Mexican authorities.
- Michael Migliore, a 23-year-old Muslim convert and dual citizen of the United States and Italy, was detained in the United Kingdom after traveling there from the U.S. by train and then cruise ship because he was not permitted to fly. He said that he believes he was placed on the no-fly list because he refused to answer questions about a 2010 Portland car bomb plot without his lawyer present. He was released eight or ten hours later, but authorities confiscated his electronic media items, including a cell phone and media player.
- Abe Mashal, a 31-year-old Muslim and United States Marine Veteran, found himself on the No Fly List in April 2010 while attempting to board a plane out of Midway Airport. He was interrogated by the TSA, FBI and Chicago Police at the airport and was told they had no clue why he was on the No Fly List. Once he arrived at home that day two other FBI agents came to his home and used a Do Not Fly question-and-answer sheet to question him. They informed him they had no idea why he was on the No Fly List. In June 2010, those same two FBI agents summoned Mashal to a local hotel and invited him to a private room. They then told him that he was in no trouble and the reason he ended up on the No Fly List was because of possibly sending emails to an American imam they may have been monitoring. They then informed him that if he would go undercover at various local mosques, they could get him off the No Fly List immediately and he would be compensated for such actions. Mashal refused to answer any additional questions without a lawyer present and was told to leave the hotel. Mashal then contacted the ACLU and is now being represented in a class-action lawsuit filed against the TSA, FBI and DHS concerning the legality of the No Fly List and how people end up on it. Mashal feels as if he was blackmailed into becoming an informant by being placed on the No Fly List. Mashal has since appeared on ABC, NBC, PBS and Al Jazeera concerning his inclusion on the No Fly List. He has also written a book about his experience titled "No Spy No Fly."
- In November 2002 Salon reported that the No-Fly program seemed "to be netting mostly priests, elderly nuns, Green Party campaign operatives, left-wing journalists, right-wing activists and people affiliated with Arab or Arab-American groups." Art dealer Doug Stuber, who ran Ralph Nader's Green Party presidential campaign in North Carolina in 2000, was prevented from flying to Europe on business in October 2002. He was repeatedly pulled out of line, held for questioning until his flight left, then told falsely he could take a later flight or depart from a different airport. Barbara Olshansky, then Assistant Legal Director for the Center for Constitutional Rights, noted that she and several of her colleagues received special attention on numerous occasions. On at least one occasion, she was ordered to pull her trousers down in view of other passengers. It is not clear why Stuber was targeted. He was initially pulled aside after loudly declaring to a fellow passenger, "George Bush is as dumb as a rock." He was on the list for over two years but was later allowed to fly.

==== DHS Traveler Redress Inquiry Program ====
The DHS Traveler Redress Inquiry Program (TRIP) is a procedure for travelers who are delayed or denied boarding of an aircraft, consistently receive excess scrutiny at security checkpoints, or are denied entry to the U.S. because they are believed to be or are told that they are on a government watch list. The traveler must complete an online application at the Department of Homeland Security website, print and sign the application, and then submit it with copies of several identifying documents. After reviewing their records, DHS notifies the traveler that if any corrections of data about them were warranted, they will be made.

Travelers who apply for redress through TRIP are assigned a record identifier called a "Redress Control Number". Airline reservations systems allow passengers who have a Redress Control Number to enter it when making their reservation.

DHS TRIP may make it easier for an airline to confirm a traveler's identity. False-positive travelers, whose names match or are similar to the names of persons on the No Fly List, will continue to match that name even after using DHS TRIP, so it will not restore a traveler's ability to use Internet or curbside check-in or to use an automated kiosk. It does usually help the airline identify the traveler as not being the actual person on the No Fly List, after an airline agent has reviewed their identity documents at check-in.

However, DHS TRIP has not been very helpful to travelers who accidentally end up on the No Fly List, as their efforts to clear their names are often futile to the extent that they are not told why they are on the list.

=== 2023 leak ===
On January 19, 2023, Swiss hacker maia arson crimew reported that she had gained access to 2019 versions of the No Fly List of 1.56 million entries and Selectee List of 250,000 entries posted by CommuteAir on an unsecured Amazon Web Services cloud server. An analysis published in 2024 based on a redacted copy of the leak noted the over-representation of certain ethno-religious groups in the list; among the 1,048,575 names on the No-Fly List, 982,242 (93.674%) of them can be categorized as Islamic or Middle Eastern.

== Controversy and criticism ==
The American Civil Liberties Union (ACLU) has long criticized the No Fly List and similar lists because of the lack of notification to persons included on such lists. The ACLU's stance is that the government has not provided a constitutionally adequate means of allowing individuals to challenge their inclusion on the list and that "constitutional rights are at stake when the government stigmatizes Americans as suspected terrorists and bans them from international travel."

Among the complaints about the No Fly List is the use of credit reports in calculating the risk score. In response to the controversy, Transportation Security Administration (TSA) officials said in 2005 that they would not use credit scores to determine passengers' risk score and that they would comply with all rights guaranteed by the First and Fourth amendments to the United States Constitution.

In the midst of this controversy, the Government Accountability Office of the U.S. Congress produced a report critical of the CAPPS II system. It characterized the proposal as incomplete and seriously behind schedule, and noted that the TSA had failed to address "developmental, operational, and privacy issues identified by Congress". On July 14, 2004, TSA officials announced that CAPPS II was being pulled from consideration without proceeding to full testing. Critics have alleged that the TSA has merely chosen to start with a less controversial entry point that they are calling the "Registered Traveler" program. TSA has also begun testing of another program called "Secure Flight", which is supposed to solve some of the problems of CAPPS I while avoiding the privacy issues of CAPPS II.

In January 2009, Marcus Holmes conservatively estimated the total cost of the program to be $536 million since 9/11, with a reasonable estimation range that approaches $1 billion, and he questioned whether the benefits of the list outweigh the costs.

The 2023 leak re-ignited criticisms that the No-Fly list is insufficiently secure. Critics note that if it is not possible to abolish the No-Fly list or make placement on it appealable, Congress should at least review and improve the federal government's data security to prevent any future leaks.

=== Lawsuits ===
On April 6, 2004, the American Civil Liberties Union "filed a nationwide class-action challenge to the government's No Fly List", in which they charge that "many innocent travelers who pose no security risk whatsoever are discovering that their government considers them terrorists – and find that they have no way to find out why they are on the list, and no way to clear their names." The case was settled in 2006, when "the federal government agreed to pay $200,000 in attorneys' fees to the ACLU of Northern California" and to "[make] public, for the first time, hundreds of records about the government's secret 'no fly' list used to screen airline passengers after September 11, 2001." On August 5, 2010, the ACLU filed a lawsuit on behalf of 14 plaintiffs challenging their placement on the No Fly List. and on June 24, 2014, U.S. District Judge Anna J. Brown ruled in favor of the plaintiffs saying that air travel is a "sacred" liberty protected by the U.S. Constitution and ordered the government to change its system for challenging inclusion.

A Malaysian academic has been the first to successfully bring a suit involving the No Fly List to trial. On August 18, 2008, the Ninth Circuit Court of Appeals in San Francisco issued a ruling on behalf of Rahinah Ibrahim, who was a Stanford University graduate student when she was arrested at the San Francisco-Oakland International Airport in 2005, overturning a lower court decision and allowing her case against inclusion in the No Fly List to proceed through the court system. A public trial began on December 2, 2013 in San Francisco in the courtroom of U.S. District Judge William Alsup. After the government revealed that Ibrahim had ended up on the list because of human error by the FBI, Alsup ruled on January 14, 2014 "that Ibrahim did have the right to sue and ordered the government to tell Ibrahim whether she is still on the list." Ibrahim was represented by the San Jose-based law firm of McManis Faulkner. Ibrahim was awarded $400,000 in court costs; in January 2019 the Ninth U.S. Circuit Court of Appeals ruled that she was entitled to the "vast majority" of the millions of dollars in costs her lawyers were requesting, and ordered Alsup to rule on whether the government had acted in bad faith.

Gulet Mohamed, a U.S. citizen from Virginia, was placed on the no-fly list as a teenager in 2011 while he was visiting family in Kuwait. Because he was on the no-fly list, he was unable to return to the U.S. before his visa expired. He was taken into custody in Kuwait for overstaying his visa, where he alleges that he "was repeatedly beaten and tortured by his interrogators". Kuwaiti authorities tried to deport him to the U.S., but the airline denied him boarding, presumably because he was on the U.S. No Fly List, and he was returned to prison. While he was imprisoned in Kuwait, a lawsuit was filed on his behalf in the Eastern District of Virginia by the Council on American–Islamic Relations. After the lawsuit was filed, he was allowed to return to the U.S.; the U.S. government then moved to dismiss the lawsuit as moot. On May 28, 2013, the 4th Circuit Court of Appeals rejected the government's motion to dismiss Mohamed's lawsuit. On January 22, 2014, Judge Anthony J. Trenga denied most of another government motion to dismiss the lawsuit, allowing the case to proceed toward trial.

In 2015 Yonas Fikre of Oregon sued the FBI for harm to his reputation and violation of his due process rights to travel, after he was placed on the No Fly List and then removed. In September 2023, the US Supreme Court agreed to hear the FBI's appeal against the litigation. The Court ruled in Federal Bureau of Investigation v. Fikre that a complaint about being put on the No Fly List is not moot simply because the government later took the plaintiff off the List.

== No fly lists in other countries ==
Canada's federal government has created its own no fly list as part of a program called Passenger Protect. The Canadian list incorporates data from domestic and foreign intelligence sources, including the U.S. No Fly List. It contains between 500 and 2,000 names.

In addition, Canada's access to information system revealed that the US "Tuscan" (Tipoff US/Canada) database is provided to every Canadian border guard and immigration officer; they have the power to detain, interrogate, arrest and deny entry to anyone listed on it. Unlike the no-fly list, which only applies to airports, Tuscan is used for every Canadian land and sea border, and visa and immigration application.

In Pakistan, the no fly list is known as the Exit Control List.

India formed its own No Fly List to tackle unruly behavior in 2017.

Brazil followed suit in 2026, with the approval, by the National Civil Aviation Agency, of a resolution creating a No Fly List. The initiative focuses primarily on curtailing flight attendant harassment and provides for a maximum period of 12 months of exclusion from Brazilian airlines.

== See also ==
- Computer Assisted Passenger Prescreening System
- FBI Index
- Hollywood blacklist
- Interpol Terrorism Watch List
- Office of Foreign Assets Control

== Sources ==
- "Homeland Insecurity: Why 'No-Fly' Just Doesn't Fly" by Randall Amster, Truthout, February 3, 2010.
- "Meet Mikey, 8: U.S. Has Him on Watch List" New York Times, January 14, 2010.
- "Unlikely Terrorists On No Fly List" 60 Minutes, October 8, 2006.
- ACLU Challenges Government No-Fly List
- Shuford, Reginald T. (April 6, 2004). "Michelle D. Green; John F. Shaw; David C. Fathi; Sarosh Syed; Mohamed Ibrahim; David Nelson; Alexandra Hay, on behalf of themselves and all others similarly situated, Plaintiffs, v. Transportation Security Administration" (PDF). American Civil Liberties Union.
- 1,600 are Suggested Daily for FBI's List by Walter Pincus, Washington Post, November 1, 2009
- Plaintiff in ACLU Suit Challenging Government No-Fly List Describes Struggle – video report by Democracy Now!
- Mrs Shipley's Ghost The Right to Travel and Terrorist Watchlists by Jeffrey Kahn, University of Michigan Press, 2013; – book on the No Fly List and other terrorist watchlists
