= CARRP =

US Citizenship and Immigration Services policy

The Controlled Application Review and Resolution Program (CARRP) is a policy within United States Citizenship and Immigration Services (USCIS) that aims to prevent selected individuals from obtaining citizenship or immigration benefits. The policy was created in 2008 and mainly targets immigrants from Arab, Middle Eastern, Muslim and South Asian communities, with the top 5 countries being Pakistan, Iraq, India, Iran and Yemen. By law, immigration applications must be adjudicated within 180 days, but the program introduces a loop of indefinite delays by citing national security or public safety concerns. Applications for naturalization, lawful permanent residency, and asylum are the most common selections for CARRP processing.

Placement of applications into the program depends on a number of subjective factors and associations such as monetary remittances into middle-eastern countries, loose associations through social media or contact with individuals suspected of being involved in terroristic activities, or unsubstantiated allegations sent to immigration authorities by people opposed to the individuals' immigration efforts.

As of 2019, close to 42,000 people have had their US immigration applications blacklisted through the CARRP program. While the program has operated largely covertly, the ACLU has compiled a library of documents on the policy obtained through Freedom of Information Act (FOIA) requests.

Currently, the only known remedy is for individuals to sue the involved agencies in federal court. CARRP has been undergoing litigation since 2017. As of 2022, USCIS put a moratorium on denials of green card and naturalization applications while the program works its way through the courts. In January 2025, a federal court found that the program was "arbitrary and capricious" and that USCIS had failed to justify the policy's creation, but that the plaintiffs had failed to prove that the policy violated the 14th Amendment.

== CARRP Processing ==
=== Identifying "national security concerns" ===
CARRP divides concerns into "Known or Suspected Terrorists" (KSTs) and "not-Known or Suspected Terrorists" (non-KSTs).

To be considered a KST, a person must have been previously identified as the federal government as a security threat and put on the Terrorist Screening Database.

USCIS relies on three categories of indicators to determine if an applicant is a non-KST.

1. Statutory indicators: The applicant is suspected to have ties to a Tier I, II, or III terrorist organization or an organization "likely to meet" the definition of a Tier III organization, despite not being formally recognized. To be subject to CARRP, the evidence does not need to meet the standard of inadmissibility or removability.
2. Non-statutory indicators: Officers must examine an applicant's professional and educational affiliations, suspicious activities, and personal relationships. Indicators may include military service, education in nuclear physics, unusual travel patterns, or "close associat[ion] with a person who is considered a national security concern.
3. Indicators Contained in Security Check Results: Results found in background checks, including financial transactions with individuals that the U.S. detained in Afghanistan or Pakistan, or individuals whose names appear in an FBI file.

=== Deconfliction ===
This process may take place at any point during the adjudication process. USCIS collaborates with the law enforcement agency possesses the information that identified the applicant as a security risk. USCIS must ensure that their processing of the application will not interfere with an ongoing investigation. During this stage, an applicant may receive a Request for Evidence or be approached by law enforcement for questioning.

=== Re-examination of application ===
Once a potential threat has been identified, USCIS will review their application again with stricter scrutiny than usual. They will particularly look for any potential inconsistencies that could be indicative of fraud or false testimony.

If no indications of fraud or ineligibility are found, the officer's attention will turn to the evidence that flagged the applicant as a security risk. They will look through the Department of Homeland Security's records as well as anything in the applicant's Alien File.

=== Secondary collaboration with law enforcement ===
If still no flags are raised, USCIS will return to the law enforcement agency in possession of the evidence. Any additional information that the agency has on the applicant will be requested.

=== Adjudication ===
A KST's application cannot be approved. A Non-KST's application may be approved, but supervising and senior officials must agree with the adjudicating officer's findings. If USCIS determines that an applicant is a KST or non-KST but cannot find a reason to deny the application, the application may be forwarded to USCIS headquarters for final review and issue of denial. An applicant may be denied without ever being told that they are under CARRP review.

== Legal Challenges ==
A number of lawsuits have been filed on behalf of individuals affected by this program, although most have been dismissed after USCIS then approved the complainants applications. The ACLU filed a lawsuit in 2017 (Wagafe et al. vs Trump et al.), which has been certified as a class-action lawsuit for all individuals whose application has been unduly delayed. The suit alleges that the program is both illegal under immigration law and unconstitutional on due process violation grounds. The due process claim stems from the fact that applicants are not told that they are being subjected to CARRP, and may not be told the true reason for their case's denial, giving them no opportunity to defend themselves. It also argues that the guidelines for being placed on the watchlist are unconstitutionally broad. On April 5, 2021, litigation continued with Joe Biden as defendant.

As of 2022, USCIS put a moratorium on denials of green card and naturalization applications while litigation pends.

A January 2025 judgment found that USCIS had not adequately justified the program's necessity and failed to ensure that naturalization applications were adjudicated in a timely manner. The court ruled that CARRP violated plaintiffs' due process rights by failing to notify them that they were subject to the policy, but that the plaintiffs had failed to prove that applicants were being targeted based on their religion or country of origin. All involved parties were ordered to meet within 30 days of the judgment to attempt to resolve the outstanding issues.
