= BCBP =

BCBP may refer to:

- Bar Coded Boarding Pass
- Bureau of Customs and Border Protection
