= Terrorist Identities Datamart Environment =

U.S. government database

The Terrorist Identities Datamart Environment (TIDE) is the U.S. government's central database on known or suspected international terrorists, and contains highly classified information provided by members of the Intelligence Community such as the CIA, DIA, FBI, NSA, and many others.

As of February 2017, there are 1.6 million names in TIDE. In 2008, more than 27,000 names were removed from the list when it was determined they no longer met the criteria for inclusion. According to the FBI, international terrorists include those persons who carry out terrorist activities under foreign direction. For this purpose, they may include U.S. persons (U.S. citizens and legal permanent residents). The Terrorist Identities Group (TIG), located in the NCTC's Information Sharing & Knowledge Development Directorate (ISKD), is responsible for building and maintaining TIDE.

From the classified TIDE database, an unclassified, but sensitive, extract is provided to the FBI's Threat Screening Center, which compiles the Terrorist Screening Database (TSDB).

This database, in turn, is used to compile various watch lists such as the TSA's No Fly List, State Department's Consular Lookout and Support System, Homeland Security's Interagency Border Inspection System, and FBI's NCIC (National Crime Information Center) for state and local law enforcement.

== Tuscan ==
There is a huge, secretive US anti-terrorism database for Canada specifically, "Tuscan" (Tipoff US/Canada), revealed by Canada’s access to information system. The database is used by both the US and Canada, and applies to all borders, not just airports; it is provided, in addition to US personnel, to every Canadian border guard and immigration officer, who have the power to detain, interrogate, arrest and deny entry to anyone listed on it. It is believed to contain information on about 680,000 people thought to be linked with terrorism. The list was created in 1997 as a consular aid. It was repurposed and expanded after 9/11, and again in 2016. The names in Tuscan come from the US Terrorist Identities Datamart Environment (Tide), which populates various US traveller databases, Canada’s Tuscan and the Australian equivalent, "Tactics".

== See also ==
- Computer Assisted Passenger Prescreening System
- Datamart
- Open Source Information System
- No Fly List
- Selectee list
