= Traveler Redress Inquiry Program =

The Traveler Redress Inquiry Program (TRIP, sometimes called DHS TRIP) is a program managed by the Department of Homeland Security in the United States that allows people who face security-related troubles traveling by air, receive excessive security scrutiny, or are denied entry to the United States, to file their grievances with and seek redress from the DHS.

== Use cases for TRIP ==
TRIP is intended for people who have unfortunate interactions with the United States Customs and Border Protection (CBP) while entering or exiting the United States, and also for people traveling within the United States who are denied or delayed because their name is on a No Fly List or other Federal Government watchlist.

While DHS TRIP can be used to file complaints about the behavior of Transportation Security Administration officials, complaints about the TSA can also be filed online directly with the TSA website. The latter are handled by the Multicultural Branch (MB) within the TSA.

== Reception ==
TRIP launched on February 21, 2007. Upon launch, it was tentatively praised by the National Business Travelers Association and the Association of Corporate Travel Executives. Anita Ramasastry wrote for FindLaw that, although an improvement over the status quo, TRIP still did not accord travelers sufficient due process.

A 165-page report was prepared by the Department of Homeland Security Office of Inspector General based on a field investigation between March 2008 and September 2008. Originally released September 11, 2009, it was released publicly with some sensitive security information redacted in October 2009. The report found numerous inefficiencies in the program and scope for improvement in security, privacy, reliability, and timeliness. One of the problems noted by the report was that even after DHS cleared a particular individual from the watchlist, airlines might still be using outdated versions of the list and might therefore flag cleared individuals. DHS said it was planning to transition to the Secure Flight program where the responsibility of managing the watchlist would rest with the government rather than with airlines, thereby eliminating the need to coordinate list updates with airlines.

In July 2009, the Electronic Frontier Foundation requested copies of all complaints submitted to DHS TRIP. In January 2010, DHS released a summary in lieu of the actual complaints.
