= Hernando Calvo Ospina =

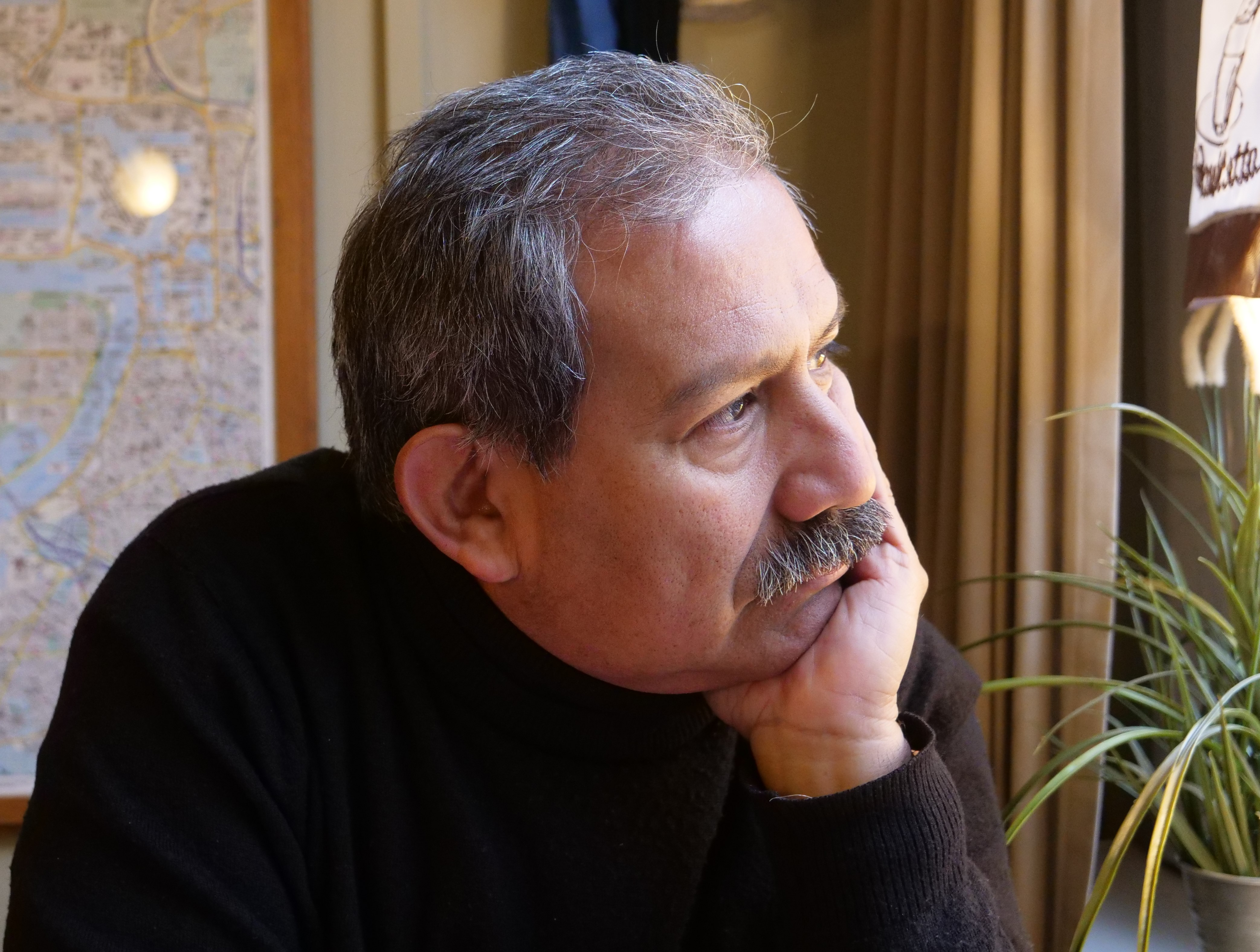
Hernando Calvo Ospina

Hernando Calvo Ospina (born 6 June 1961) is a Colombian journalist, author and director of various documentaries. He resides in France.

== Life and work ==
Born in Cali, he was a student of journalism at the Central University of Ecuador in Quito, Ecuador when, on 24 September 1985 he was captured and disappeared. As he denounced later at the Court of Constitutional Guarantees of Ecuador as well as to Amnesty International and other international human rights organisations, he spent the first three days cuffed by hands and feet as well as blindfolded. During all that time he was not allowed to sleep nor was he given anything to eat and he was scarcely administered any water to drink.

From his abductors, he learned that had been captured during a joint operation of the Colombian and the Ecuadorian military intelligence. It should be pointed out that days before, a commando of the Colombian guerrilla of 19 April Movement (Movimiento 19 de Abril, M-19) had abducted a wealthy Ecuadorian business man, in response to which the security services had started a "witch hunt" against all Colombian residents which were considered to be politically left-wing. And he was a renowned critic of the Colombian government and was active on several public media.

Still blindfolded and cuffed he was transferred in the trunk of a car by his first captors who handed him over to the Police Criminal Investigation Service (Servicio de Investigación Criminal de la Policía, SIC). For five days he was brutally tortured through beating and electric shocks. He was hardly given anything to eat, apart from some bread and left-overs of the officers' canteen. On 4 October, as there was no proof of his affiliation to any guerrilla organisation whatsoever, he was sent to the García Moreno penitentiary, where he stayed for almost three months without being brought to trial.

Because of the overwhelming international pressure, the government of president León Febres Cordero had to authorise his release from prison on 28 December 1985, be it through putting him on a direct flight to Lima, Peru. After having spent two months under the protection of the United Nations High Commission for Refugees, UNHCR, in this nation, the government of president Alan García considered him to be persona non-grata and demanded that he should leave the country. Under the protection of the government of France he arrived in Paris on 15 March 1986.

Before resuming his profession as a journalist, and because he had to survive, he cleaned offices during the first four years of his life in Paris.

He has been a volleyball trainer and referee, as well as a passionate dancer and collector of salsa music.

He is the author of several books, all translated into different languages: Spanish, French, English, Italian, German, Dutch, Turkish, Persian, Czech (see bibliography).

As a collaborator of the French monthly Le Monde diplomatique, he participated in the production of various documentaries for television broadcasting channels, such as: the British BBC; the French-German Arte; the German ADR. Over the past years he made various documentaries that were basically distributed by the Latin American channel Tele Sur. One of them, Venezuela, the shadow agenda, was subtitled in 17 different languages. Some of his productions and interviews can be found on his YouTube channel.

In 2005 he was nominated for the "Lorenzo Natali Media Prize" of the European Commission, for his article "Colombia: such as in Iraq, a privatised conflict" (Colombia: como él de Irak, un conflicto privatizado), published in Le Monde diplomatique in November 2004. The award was launched in 1992 in recognition of outstanding reporting on development issues, inequality, human rights and the eradication of poverty.

He shared conferences with personalities such as the Cuban leader, Fidel Castro Ruz, and the president of Venezuela, Hugo Chávez Frías. He interviewed the president of Ecuador, Rafael Correa, and other distinguished people such as: Danielle Mitterrand, the actor Pierre Richard and Monsignor Jacques Gaillot (France); the sociologist James Petras (United States); the French-Spanish journalist Ignacio Ramonet; the commander of the Cuban Revolution Victor Dreke and the intellectual of the same nationality Abel Prieto.

As a journalist, he also interviewed commanders of the Armed Revolutionary Forces of Colombia (Fuerzas Armadas Revolucionarias de Colombia, FARC) - which at that time was a guerrilla organisation - Raúl Reyes and Jaime Guaracas. As well as commanders of the National Liberation Army (Ejército de Liberación Nacional, ELN), Manuel Pérez Martínez (ex-Commander in Chief Milton Hernández, Ramiro Vargas and Pablo Beltrán.

For the writing of his book Don Pablo Escobar, he passed various days with members of the so-called Medellín Cartel. Working on Perú: los senderos posibles (Peru: Possible Paths), he interviewed generals of the Armed Forces of Peru, as well as commanders and supporters of the Shining Path organisation (Sendero Luminoso). In Miami and in New York he interviewed leaders of organisations alleged to be responsible for crimes and terrorist attacks, such as Orlando Bosch Ávila, Nazario Sargent, José "Pepe" Hernández and José Basulto, all of them of Cuban origin. Based on these and other interviews he published Disidentes o Mercenarios? (Dissidents or mercenaries?).

In January 2005 the documentary The Secret of the Bat: Bacardi Between Rum And Revolution (El Secreto del Murciélago. Bacardi, Entre Ron y Revolución) was awarded the Bronze World Medal of the New York Film Festival. The documentary, in which Calvo Ospina also figures, was based on his book Bacardi, The Hidden War. On 5 February 2009 he lectured on "Private military societies in Colombia" during the seminar on the "Privatisation of violence" organised by the Centre de recherche des écoles de Saint-Cyr Coëtquidan (CREC), at the higher education institute for officers of the French Armed Forces.

Being an investigator who denounces the state terrorism in Colombia as well as the aggressive politics of the United States, particularly towards Latin America, he discovered on 18 April 2009 that he appeared on the "No Fly List" of the US authorities when the flight which he was on, was prohibited to fly over the US air space "for reasons of national security". The Air France aircraft had departed from Paris and headed for Mexico City without making a stop in the United States.

On 6 May 2012 Calvo Ospina had to travel from Madrid to Havana with Air Europe, a Spanish company. Before receiving his boarding pass, a staff member took him to a man who presented himself as a civil servant of the US Embassy. The man was very straightforward and informed him that he could not go on that particular flight because it would be overflying the airspace of his country during 5 minutes and his name appeared on the No Fly List.

On 8 September 2018 he was denied his boarding pass once again. This time it happened in the airport of Orly in Paris, from where he wanted to travel to Cuba with the French company CORSAIR. The manager of the company gave him the phone number of the office from where he had received the order: it was the Transportation Security Administration, TSA, in Washington that answered the phonehttp://www.elcorreo.eu.org/De-nuevo-arbitrariedades-de-los-Estados-Unidos-prohiben-el-transporte-de-personas?lang=fr.

The case of Calvo Ospina induced the Spanish journal El País to explain the reason why the European authorities and their transport companies accepted that the United States take this kind of decisions, i.e. in order to avoid passengers to descend in their territory.

On 22 September 2011 the French government denied him the French nationality. The letter sent by the Ministry of Internal Affairs says that this decision was taken because of his "relationships with the Cuban representation in Paris" and "his proximity to the castrist ideology." He was also reproached for having met members of the FARC "during his activities as a journalist" and for appearing on the "American list of persons who were prohibited to fly over the air space of the United States."

He attended the World Assembly of the Encuentro Mundial de Intelectuales y Artistas en Defensa de la Humanidad (World Assembly of Intellectuals and Artists for the Defense of Humanity), which took place in Caracas, Venezuela, from 1 to 5 December 2004 and gathered more than 400 representatives from 52 countries and cultures. During this event, the idea launched by several intellectuals from Mexico and Cuba the year before took shape. Ever since he has been one of the active members of the REDH (Red de Intelectuales y Artistas En Defensa de la Humanidad).

On 18 July 2016 the Municipal Council of the Poder Popular of Guantánamo, Cuba, awarded him a replica of La Fama, the symbol of the city, as well as the Commemorative Seal on the occasion of the premiere of his documentary Todo Guantánamo es nuestro ("All Guantanamo Is Ours"). He was also honoured by the Instituto Cubano de Amistad con los Pueblos (Cuban Institute for Friendship with the People, ICAP) and received the award from the hands of its vice-president, Fernando Gonzalez Llort, Hero of the Republic of Cuba. On both occasions he was honoured for "his activism in favour of Cuba and its truths". "For contributing to making the truth about Cuba known to the world as it is being regularly distorted by the big transnational media concerns".

On April 22, 2025, on the occasion of World Book and Copyright Day, proclaimed by UNESCO in November 1995, the delegation of the Bolivarian Republic of Venezuela to that international institution awarded you the UNESCO Commemorative Medal of the Bicentennial of the Birth of Simón Bolívar, in "recognition of your professional and intellectual career".

He is a member of the Société des gens de lettres, SGDL, a private French association. It was founded in Paris on April 16, 1838, on the idea of Louis Desnoyers, supported by Honoré de Balzac.

In France, he is a member of the Société des Auteurs et Compositeurs Dramatiques (SACD), founded on July 3, 1777, in Paris by Pierre-Augustin Caron de Beaumarchais.

== Bibliography ==
=== In English ===
- Salsa! Havana Heat, Bronx Beat. 1995. Latin America Bureau, London.
- The Cuban Exile Movement. Dissidents or Mercenaries?. (co-author Katlijn Declercq) 2000. Ocean Press, New York.
- Bacardi, The Hidden War. 2002. PlutoPress, London.

=== Other titles not available in English ===
- Don Pablo Escobar. 1994. EPO, Brussels.
- Perú, los senderos posibles. (co-author Katlijn Declercq) 1994. Txalaparta, Spain.
- Ah, die Belgen! 1996. EPO, Brussels.
- ¿Disidentes o Mercenarios? (co-author Katlijn Declercq) 1998. Vosa-Sodepaz, Madrid.
- Sur un air de Cuba. 2005. Le Temps des cerises, Paris.
- Colombia, democracia y terrorismo de Estado. 2008. Foca, Madrid.
- El equipo de Choque de la CIA. 2010. El Viejo Topo, Barcelona.
- Calla y respira. 2013. El Viejo Topo, Barcelona.
- Colombie : répression et insurrection. 2014. Bruno leprince, Paris
- Latinas de falda y pantalón. 2015. El Viejo Topo, Barcelona.
- No fly list y otros cuentos exóticos. 2019. El perro y la rana, Caracas.
- El Enigma de La Coubre. 2021. Ediciones Dyskolo, España.

== Documentaries ==
- The US Blockade against Cuba: The US Blockade against Cuba - "The longest genocide in history"
- ALL GUANTANAMO IS OURS:
- Venezuela, the shadow agenda: Venezuela, the shadow agenda. A documentary by Hernando Calvo OspinaThe US Blockade against Cuba
- IMAGENES: "The importance of taking the time to observe : https://www.youtube.com/watch?v=ABWF1ELoWk8&t=31s
- The enigma of the boat "La coubre" :
