= Gulet Mohamed =

American placed on no fly list

- Born: 1991 (age 34–35); Somalia
- Known for: Held in extrajudicial detention with the collusion of US officials in what has been called "rendition-lite"

Gulet Mohamed (born 1991) is a naturalized United States citizen who was detained in Kuwait and placed on the no-fly list maintained by the Terrorist Screening Center.

Mohamed was born in Somalia and immigrated in 1995. He was raised in Alexandria, Virginia, by his immigrant parents. In March 2009, Mohamed travelled to Yemen where he stayed for three weeks and then to Somalia to stay with relatives. He stated that the purpose of his trip was to meet his extended family and to study Islam and Arabic. In August 2009, he went to Kuwait to live with his uncle.

On December 20, 2010, Mohamed went to the Kuwait Airport to renew his visa, and was detained by two men who placed him in a car and blindfolded him. He was placed in a jail cell and interrogated about whether he knew Anwar al-Aulaqi or Osama bin Laden. His interrogators insisted that Mohamed knew al-Aulaqi from the time that the cleric had preached in Falls Church, Virginia in 2001, when he was 10 years old. The interrogators demanded his e-mail and Facebook passwords and took his iPhone. He claims that he was severely beaten and deprived of sleep. After a week, on December 28, Mohamed was taken to a Kuwait deportation facility where he was visited by three FBI agents, who said that his travels "raised red flags." Mohamed claimed that the FBI agents requested that he become an informant for the Bureau, but he declined. On December 28, Mohamed used another detainee's contraband cell phone to call his family, who in turn contacted the Council on American-Islamic Relations (CAIR).

Mohamed's family sent his older brother to Kuwait to arrange for his release. On January 16, 2011, the Kuwait government advised Mohamed's family to purchase a plane ticket back to Washington and drove him to the airport in an effort to deport him. When he arrived at the airport, he was not allowed to board his flight because he was on the no-fly list. On January 18, 2011, Mohamed's attorney, provided by the CAIR, filed a lawsuit in U.S. District Court in Alexandria, Virginia seeking his return to the United States. The federal government agreed to arrange for his return when the Judge was poised to order it. Mohamed was allowed to leave Kuwait on January 20, 2011 and arrived at Dulles Airport on January 21. Mohamed claims that he was detained and interrogated at Dulles for two hours without his lawyer present despite his request for counsel.
