= Threat Screening Center =

US FBI special division

Coordinates: 38.9033°N 77.2465°W

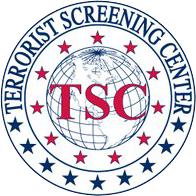
- Emblem of the Threat Screening Center
- Active: December 1, 2003 – present (22 years)
- Country: United States
- Agency: Federal Bureau of Investigation
- Part of: National Security Branch
- Headquarters: J. Edgar Hoover Building; Washington, D.C.
- Abbreviation: TSC

Commanders
- Current commander: Steve McQueen

Website
- Official website

The Threat Screening Center (formerly Terrorist Screening Center) or the TSC, is a division of the National Security Branch of the Federal Bureau of Investigation (FBI). It is the duty of the TSC to identify suspected or potential terrorists. Though housed within the FBI, the TSC is a multi-agency organization, including representatives from the United States Department of Justice, the United States Department of State, the United States Department of Homeland Security, the United States Department of Defense, the United States Postal Service, and various private contractors. It is located in Vienna, Virginia, near Virginia State Route 123.

Established by presidential directive in the wake of the September 11, 2001 attacks, the TSC's funding and manpower have significantly increased since that time.

In March 2025, the FBI renamed the division from Terrorist Screening Center to the Threat Screening Center.

== Duties ==
The Threat Screening Center maintains a database, the Terrorist Screening Database (TSDB), the aim of which is to contain information about all known or suspected terrorists, and makes this information available to a number of different government agencies, including the federal, state, local and tribal law enforcement agencies, the U.S. State Department, U.S. Citizenship and Immigration Services and the Transportation Security Administration.

== Leadership ==
The Threat Screening Center is headed by a director, who reports to the executive assistant director of the FBI National Security Branch. The current director is Steve McQueen.

== Organization ==
The Threat Screening Center has three branches:

- Information Technology Branch – oversees IT planning and systems architecture, including the design, maintenance, and modification of the TSDB that houses the consolidated watch list information
- Administration Branch – handles personnel matters, security and guard services, budgetary issues, and logistics and physical space
- Operations Branch – houses the TSC's 24-hour, 7-day a week call center, handling inquiries, complaints, and comments from law enforcement
  - Nominations Group – responsible for additions, deletions, and modifications to the consolidated watch list.
  - Tactical Analysis Group – performs analysis on encounters with potential terrorists to identify usable intelligence and forwards the information to the necessary parties

== See also ==
- No-fly list
- Selectee list
- Presidential directive
