= Intelligence Reform and Terrorism Prevention Act =

Act of Congress

Intelligence Reform and Terrorism Prevention Act of 2004
- Long title: An Act to reform the intelligence community and the intelligence and intelligence-related activities of the United States Government, and for other purposes.
- Acronyms (colloquial): IRTPA
- Enacted by: the 108th United States Congress
- Effective: December 17, 2004

Citations
- Public law: 108-458
- Statutes at Large: 118 Stat. 3638

Codification
- Titles amended: 50 U.S.C.: War and National Defense
- U.S.C. sections amended: 50 U.S.C. ch. 15 § 401 et seq.

Legislative history
- Introduced in the Senate as S. 2845 by Susan Collins (R–ME) on September 23, 2004; Committee consideration by Permanent Select Committee on Intelligence, Committee on Armed Services, Committee on Financial Services, Committee on Government Reform, Committee on the Judiciary; Passed the Senate on October 6, 2004 (96–2); Passed the House on October 16, 2004 with amendment; House agreed to House amendment on December 7, 2004 (336–75) with further amendment; Senate agreed to House amendment on December 8, 2004 (89–2); Signed into law by President George W. Bush on December 17, 2004

Major amendments
- USA Freedom Act

The Intelligence Reform and Terrorism Prevention Act of 2004 (IRTPA) is a 235-page Act of Congress, signed by President George W. Bush, that broadly affects United States federal terrorism laws. The act comprises several separate titles with varying subject issues. It was enacted in response to the terror attacks of September 11, 2001.

== Overview ==
This act established the position of Director of National Intelligence (DNI), the National Counterterrorism Center (NCTC), and the Privacy and Civil Liberties Oversight Board.

The IRTPA requires the Department of Homeland Security (DHS) to take over the conducting of pre-flight comparisons of airline passenger information to Federal Government watch lists for international and domestic flights. The Transportation Security Administration (TSA) developed the Secure Flight program and issued rulemaking to implement this congressional mandate. Airline personnel will have the right to demand government-issued ID be shown if ordered by the TSA to do so, but those orders are to remain confidential, so there is no oversight as to when the airline has been ordered to request ID and when they are requesting it on their own imperative.

== Background ==
The Intelligence Reform and Terrorism Prevention Act of 2004 was originally introduced in the Senate in response to the findings of the 9/11 Commission. The commission, established to prepare a report on the circumstances surrounding the September 11, 2001 terrorist attacks, published its final report in July 2004 including a list of recommendations to overhaul United States intelligence agencies and practices. S. 2845 was developed as a response to the commission's findings and implemented some of its major recommendations.

== Legislative history ==
S. 2845 was introduced by U.S. senator Susan Collins of Maine on September 23, 2004. The Senate approved the bill, 96–2, on October 6 of the same year and it was sent to the House. After debate, the House approved the bill, 282-134, with an amendment and passed it on October 16. The bill was sent to a conference to merge the House and Senate versions and the Conference Report was agreed to on December 8 (House 336-75, Senate 89-2). President George W. Bush signed the bill into law on December 17, 2004. The drafting of the legislation was led by Andrew Weis, senior council and advisor to Senator Collins.

=== Senate floor ===
Debate on S. 2845 began on September 27, 2004. As many as 300 amendments were proposed, though most were negotiated by the bill sponsors and the amendment proposers behind the scenes to convince them to withdraw or ruled out of order.

==== Notable floor actions ====
- The Senate voted 93-4 to table a Specter amendment that would have given the DNI a 10-year fixed term. The idea was that having a fixed term would increase the position's independence from the president.
- The Senate voted 78-19 to table a Specter amendment intended to give the DNI more power over intelligence agency operations, including the Pentagon's day-to-day activities.
- The Senate voted 62-29 to table a Byrd amendment that would have restricted the DNI's budget authority and the power to transfer personnel and funds.
- The Senate voted 55-37 to table a Stevens amendment that would have deleted language requiring disclosure of the overall intelligence budget from the bill.
- The Senate agreed to the McCain amendment 97-0, adding Title VII of S. 2774 to increase transportation security.
- The Senate agreed to the Hutchison amendment 96-0 to provide for air cargo safety.
- The Senate agreed to the Roberts amendment 98-0 to maintain the applicability of section 504 of the National Security Act of 1947 in relation to fund appropriations for United States intelligence and intelligence-related activities.
- The Senate agreed 96-2 to the bill on October 6, 2004.

=== House floor ===
Speaker of the House J. Dennis Hastert introduced H.R. 10 to the floor as the House version of the intelligence overhaul bill on October 7, 2004 to be considered alongside S. 2845. H.R. 10 was passed 282-134 on October 8.

==== Notable floor actions ====
- On October 16, 2004, the House struck the enacting clause from S. 2845 and inserted H.R. 10, passing the bill the same day.

=== Conference ===
The bill was sent to conference on October 16, 2004 per the House's request. Appointed conferees from both chambers met to negotiate the two versions of the bill, but discussions broke down over the budgetary authority of the DNI. The conference lasted for weeks with no progress until Senators Collins and Lieberman proposed language—in particular, the word "abrogate"—that softened the DNI's budgetary powers, to which House conferees agreed. The conference report was filed on December 7, 2004 and agreed to in the House on the same day, with the Senate agreeing a day later.

=== Enactment ===
The bill was sent from the Senate to President Bush on December 15, 2004. It was signed on December 17 to become public law.

== Support ==
The Senate plan was backed by the 9/11 Commission, families of the 9/11 victims, a bipartisan coalition of senators and some House members, and the majority of the White House. The House plan was backed by the Pentagon camp, led by notably House Republicans, the Pentagon, the House and Senate Armed Services committees, and chairman of the Joint Chiefs of Staff General Richard B. Myers. The final bill was supported by a bipartisan House and Senate, the White House, and the general public, including the families of the 9/11 victims.

== Provisions ==
This act established the position of Director of National Intelligence (DNI), the National Counterterrorism Center (NCTC), the National Counter-Proliferation Center, and the Privacy and Civil Liberties Oversight Board. It allowed for the establishment of additional national intelligence centers at the discretion of the director of national intelligence.

The act is formally divided into eight titles:

1. "Reform of the intelligence community", also known as the National Security Intelligence Reform Act of 2004
2. "Federal Bureau of Investigation"
3. "Security clearances"
4. "Transportation security"
5. "Border protection, immigration, and visa matters"
6. "Terrorism prevention"
7. "Implementation of 9/11 Commission recommendations", also known as the 9/11 Commission Implementation Act of 2004
8. "Other matters"

=== Title I: Reform of the Intelligence Community (The National Security Intelligence Reform Act of 2004) ===
Title I established the position of the director of national intelligence (DNI), the National Counterterrorism Center, and the National Counter-Proliferation Center.

==== Director of National Intelligence (DNI) ====
The director of national intelligence is responsible for heading the United States intelligence community. The DNI acts as the principal intelligence advisor to the president, Homeland Security, and the National Security Council, as well as direct the National Intelligence Program. The position's duties include intelligence sharing between government branches and federal agencies, managing the national intelligence budget, and managing intelligence personnel.

==== National Counterterrorism Center ====
The National Counterterrorism Center's objectives are to act as a centralized government organization for terrorism and counterterrorism intelligence, conduct strategic planning, and share information between intelligence agencies.

==== National Counter-Proliferation Center ====
The National Counter-Proliferation Center was established to analyze and integrate intelligence regarding proliferation, share intelligence across agencies, create a central repository of proliferation activity intelligence, and coordinate and conduct counter-proliferation activities.

=== Title II: Federal Bureau of Investigation ===
The FBI was required to create a career path for domestic intelligence work within the agency to promote collection and analysis of intelligence. The title also developed a Reserve Service of former FBI agents to be called upon in case of a national emergency under the discretion of the FBI director.

=== Title III: Security clearances ===
The president was required to denote a single department or agency to be responsible for overseeing security clearances, which could be transferred between agencies to reduce repetitive processing.

=== Title IV: Transportation security ===
Title IV authorizes new airport security programs including screening carry-on luggage for explosives, training foreign air marshals, creating blast-resistant cargo holds, and increased screening of airport workers. Homeland Security is required to deploy biometric screening systems at airports to obtain biological information to be used to identify individual travelers. The TSA was required to test new passenger screening systems to cross-reference "no fly" lists with an integrated terrorist watch list.

The title also gives Homeland Security the authority to create a terrorist watch list for cruise ships.

=== Title V: Border protection, immigration, and visa matters ===
Title V requires states to follow national standards for drivers license eligibility, requires visa applicants to be interviewed, offers provisions for immigrants who have received training from terrorist organizations to be deported, authorized an additional 10,000 border patrol agents to be added over five years, authorized the use of unmanned aerial vehicles to monitor the Canadian border, and created 8,000 new beds in the Department of Homeland Security's detention center to house illegal aliens and terrorist suspects.

=== Title VI: Terrorism prevention ===
Title VI allows the FBI to conduct surveillance on individual terrorists not connected to a foreign power. The law requires that terrorist subjects be denied bail and held in jail until their trial unless they can prove they are not dangerous or flight risks. Conveying false or misleading information on a terrorist attack, actual or possible, was criminalized and made an imprisonable offense. Using the mail or any postal-like service as a means of attack with weapons of mass destruction was also specified as a criminal offense, and criminal penalties were expanded for the production, possession, and use of dirty bombs and the variola virus.

=== Title VII: Implementation of the 9/11 Commission Recommendations ===
Title VII included foreign policy provisions to improve U.S. diplomatic relations internationally. These include identification of terrorist sanctuaries, regulation of exports to state sponsors of terrorism and terrorist sanctuaries, U.S. support for democracy in Afghanistan and stability in Pakistan, strategic diplomatic efforts in Saudi Arabia, Muslim outreach, support of the UN Human Rights Commission, and free press promotion in the Muslim world.

=== Title VIII: Other matters ===
Title VIII authorizes the DNI to establish a formal relationship between the intelligence community and the National Infrastructure Simulation and Analysis Center, created the Office of Geospatial Management within the Department of Homeland Security, authorizes the Inspector General of the Department of Homeland Security to designate a senior staffer to manage civil rights and civil liberties cases for the department, requires the FBI to continually maintain and update enterprise and technology architecture and infrastructure, and requires the Office of Government ethics to submit financial disclosure reports to Congress.

== Controversy ==
The Pentagon and its supporters in the House were against the bill. They opposed giving the DNI authority over the Pentagon's intelligence agencies and their budgets, saying the idea was troubling. The Pentagon camp, led by House conferee Duncan Hunter, R-CA, was labeled "obstructionist" by supporters of the Senate version of the bill. Hunter denied this claim, arguing that they wanted a reform bill that did not damage the relationship between the secretary of defense and defense agencies.

Advocacy groups for families of the 9/11 victims blamed President Bush and House Republicans for the intelligence bill being stalled in Congress. They accused Bush of allowing members of the Republican party to derail the legislative process and named Speaker of the House J. Dennis Hastert as a responsible party for the bill's stagnation. The Family Steering Committee released a statement saying they were "angry and saddened that the opportunity for significant reform of our country's intelligence structure has been squandered." The group Families of September 11 also came out saying that the legislators not helping to push the legislation through the House would be held accountable by voters in the upcoming election.

== Response ==
Upon the IRTPA's passage in the Senate, President Bush released a statement calling it a historic piece of legislation that would defend America and help to protect its people from terrorism. The public response was also positive, particularly from the families of 9/11 victims who had supported the bill, however some members of Congress remained skeptical. The two senators who had voted against passing the bill, Robert C. Byrd (D-WV) and James M. Inhofe (R-OK), came out against it, expressing their regret that it had passed so quickly and without stricter provisions against illegal immigration.

The Electronic Frontier Foundation objected to Act's potential effects on civil liberties.

== See also ==
- United States Joint Intelligence Community Council
