= Secondary Security Screening Selection =

Airport security measure in the United States

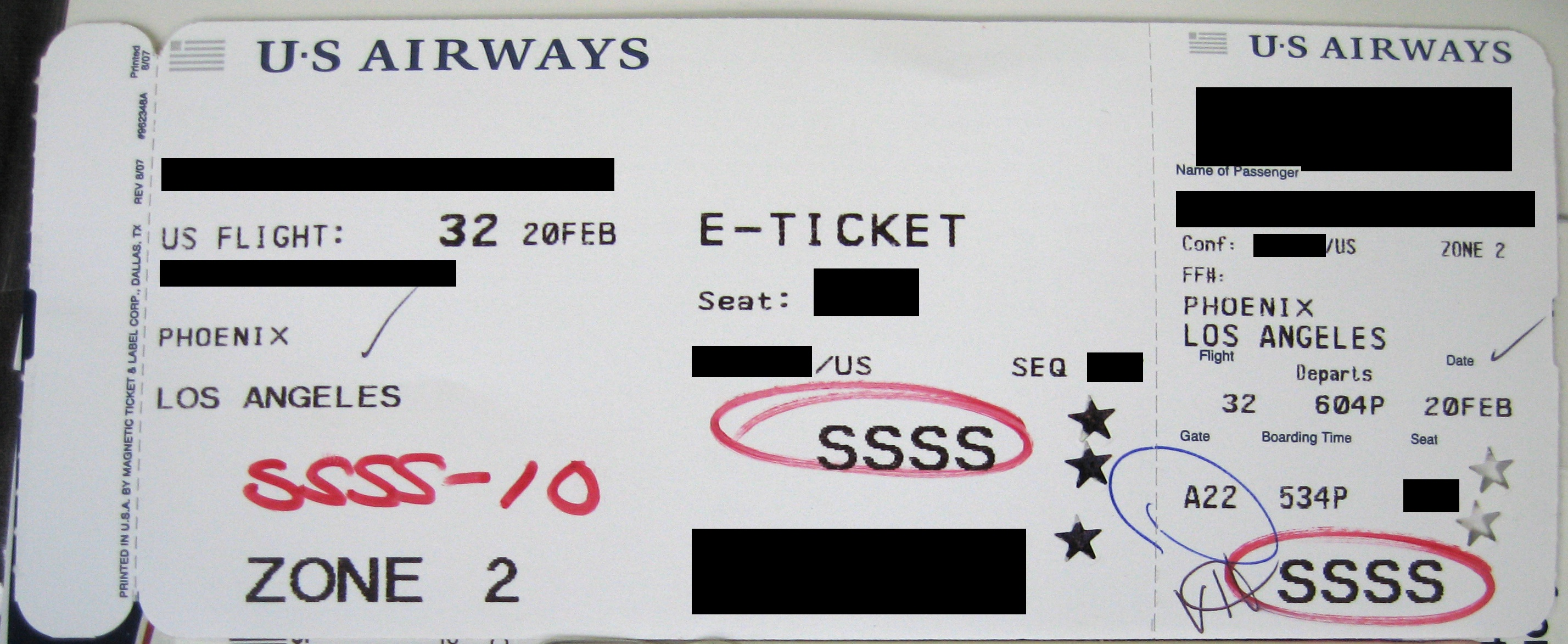
Boarding pass of passenger selected for secondary security screening, indicated by the initials SSSS.

CIA Assessment on Surviving Secondary Screening

Secondary Security Screening Selection or Secondary Security Screening Selectee (SSSS) is an airport security measure in the United States which selects passengers for additional inspection. People from certain countries are subject to it by default. The passengers may be known as Selectee, Automatic Selectee or the Selectee list. The size and contents of the list fluctuates and is a secret, although the Transportation Security Administration has stated there are tens of thousands of names on it.

The Selectee list has been cited by civil liberties groups to be infringing on privacy rights and potential for racial and ethnic discrimination.

== Procedure when selected ==
Passengers are selected for secondary screening through the Secure Flight program. If selected, the boarding pass will have the letters SSSS or *S* (all capitals) printed on their boarding passes as a signal for the need for a thorough search at security checkpoints. In the case of Southwest Airlines, secondary screening selectees may have a "checkerboard" pattern printed on their boarding passes.

SSSS passengers will go through a more intensive screening process which may include enhanced pat-downs. Their carry-on luggage may also be inspected by hand. In the case of film or other items that cannot be X-rayed, the agent may perform a test for possible explosive materials. The screener may also use a hand held metal detector to search the passenger for metal objects.

== Selection criteria ==
Neither the TSA nor the airlines publish the criteria that are used when boarding passes are issued to identify passengers who will be given extra screening or be denied boarding.

Some criteria are:

- Passengers with a one-way reservation.
- Passengers who pay cash for their tickets.
- Passengers who fly through a country that is considered "high risk" by the Department of State.
- Passengers who frequently travel to unusual destinations.
- Passengers whose name resembles someone on a Department of Homeland Security watch list.
- Random selection, according to TSA spokeswoman Amy Von Walter in 2004, and as suggested by the Washington State branch of the American Civil Liberties Union.

The Transportation Security Administration (TSA) has insisted no minors are listed on the No Fly List or the Selectee List. One minor was placed on this list in 2014 and, as of July 2017, minors with similar names to those on the lists still have difficulty in obtaining boarding passes and are subjected to additional screening.

Critics of the George W. Bush administration, including Sen. Edward Kennedy, Rep. John Lewis, feminist Naomi Wolf, peace activists Father John Dear and Sister Virgine Lawinger, Center for Constitutional Rights lawyers Barbara Olshansky and Nancy Chang, and Green Party activists Nancy Oden and Doug Stuber have been pulled aside for enhanced screening, leading activists to believe that some selectees were being harassed for speaking out against government policies.

== See also ==
- Computer Assisted Passenger Prescreening System
- No Fly List
- Terrorist Screening Database
