= Boarding pass =

Document provided to an air-travel passenger functioning as a ticket

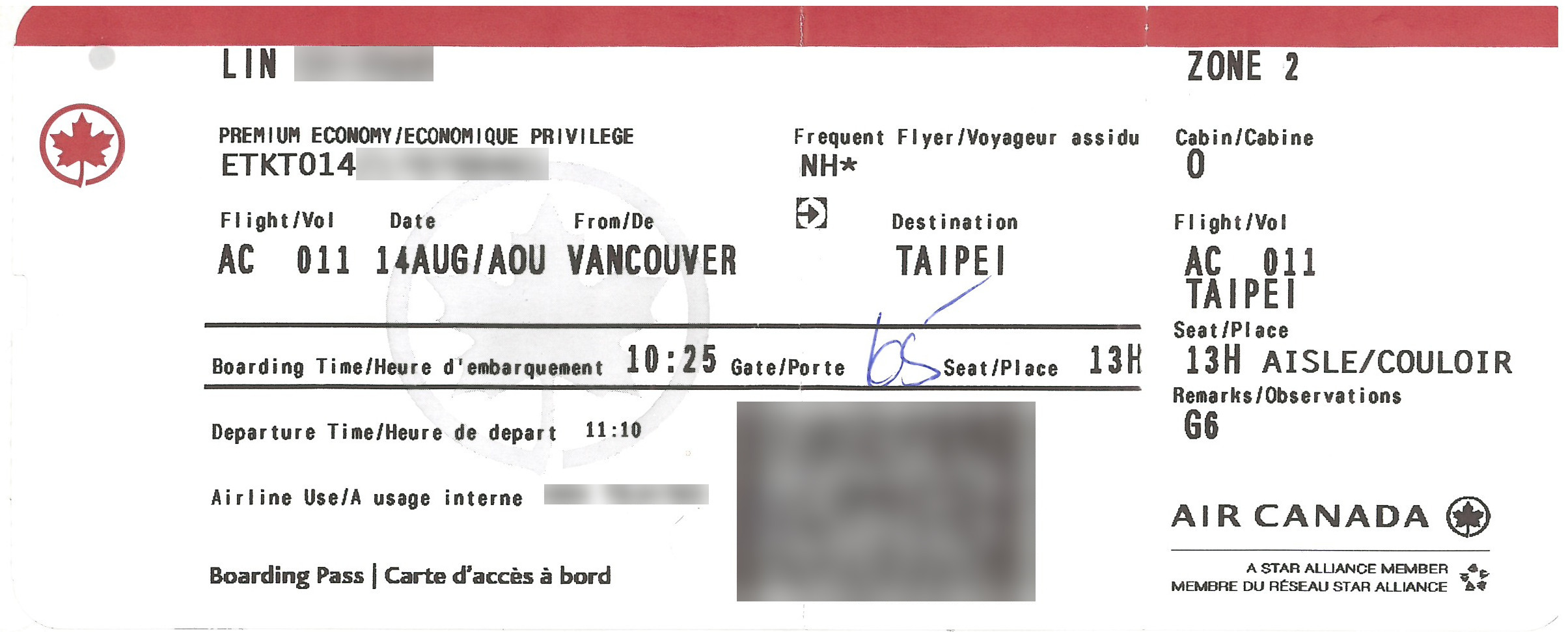
Modern boarding pass for Air Canada. A variety of information relevant to the flight is printed on the pass, including the departure and arrival airports, the passenger's travel class, the flight number and the departure time.

An older, non-computerized Air Transat boarding pass from 2000.

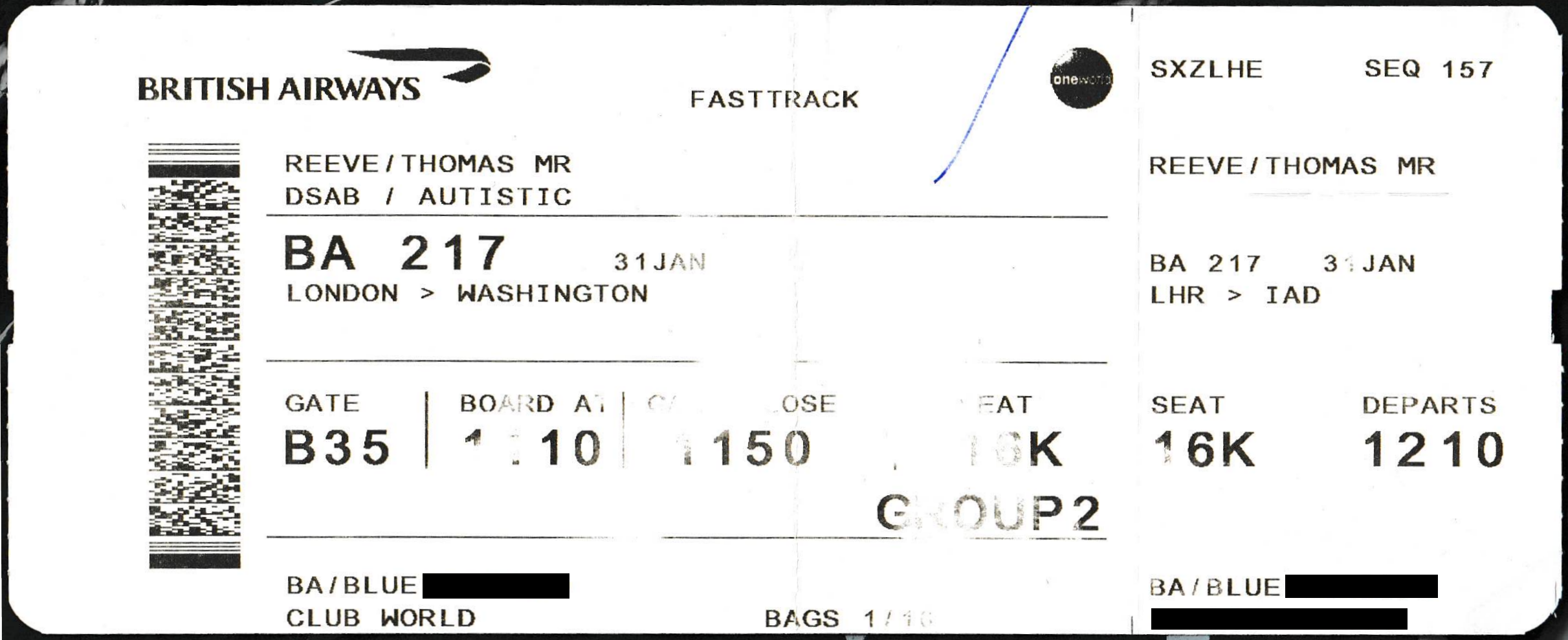
A British Airways boarding pass for a flight from Heathrow Airport to Washington Dulles International Airport. The pass features the initials DSAB (disabled) and a designator indicating that the holder is on the autism spectrum.

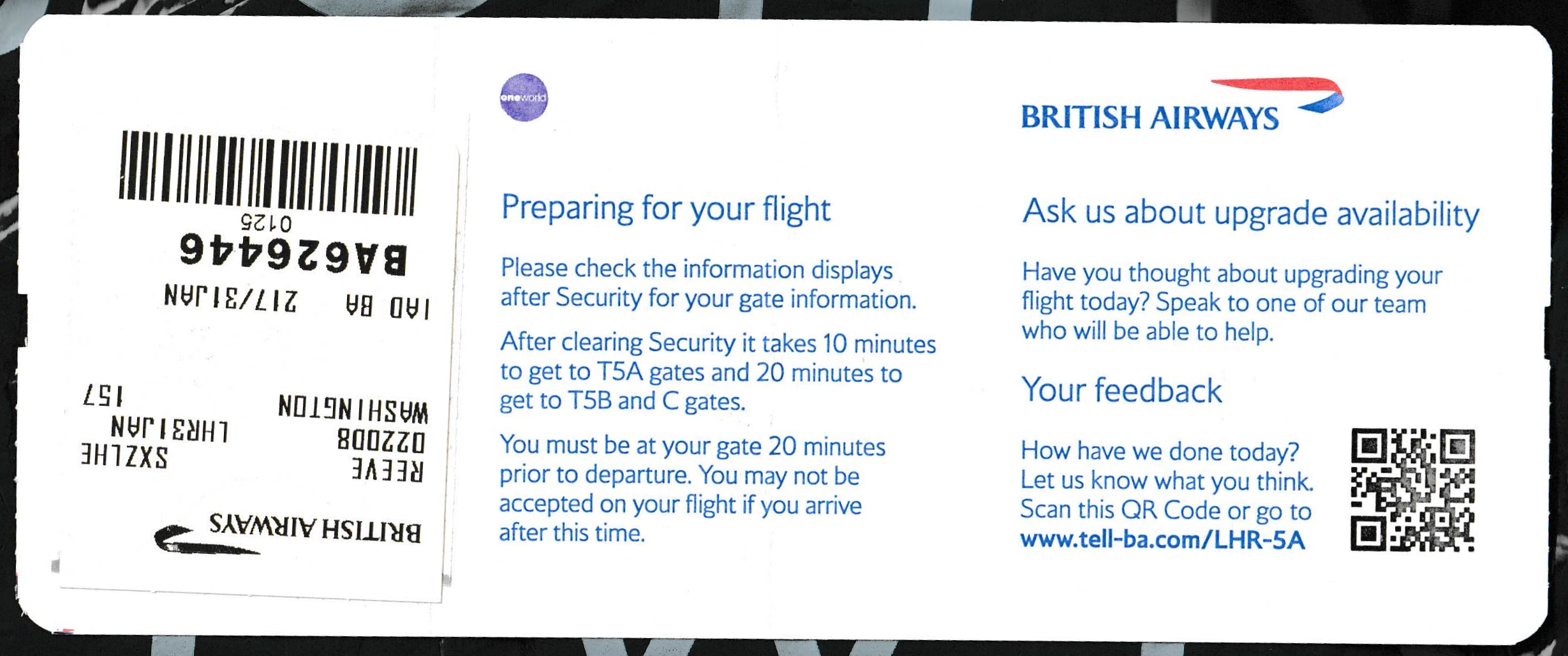
The same boarding pass's back, featuring information on navigating Heathrow Terminal 5 and upgrade availability, as well as an attached label with a barcode to be scanned by gate agents.

A boarding pass or boarding card is a document provided by an airline during airport check-in, giving a passenger permission to enter the restricted area of an airport (also known as the airside portion of the airport) and to board the airplane for a particular flight. At a minimum, it identifies the passenger, the flight number, the date, and scheduled time for departure. A boarding pass may also indicate details of the perks a passenger is entitled to (e.g., lounge access, priority boarding) and is thus presented at the entrance of such facilities to show eligibility.

In some cases, flyers can check in online and print the boarding passes themselves. There are also codes that can be saved to an electronic device or from the airline's app that are scanned during boarding. A boarding pass may be required for a passenger to enter a secure area of an airport.

Generally, a passenger with an electronic ticket will only need a boarding pass. If a passenger has a paper airline ticket, that ticket (or flight coupon) may be required to be attached to the boarding pass for the passenger to board the aircraft. For "connecting flights", a boarding pass is required for each new leg (distinguished by a different flight number), regardless of whether a different aircraft is boarded or not.

The paper boarding pass (and ticket, if any), or portions thereof, are sometimes collected and counted for cross-check of passenger counts by gate agents, but more frequently are scanned (via barcode or magnetic strip) and returned to the passengers in their entirety. The standards for bar codes and magnetic stripes on boarding passes are published by the IATA. The bar code standard (Bar Coded Boarding Pass) defines the 2D bar code printed on paper boarding passes or sent to mobile phones for electronic boarding passes. The magnetic stripe standard (ATB2) expired in 2010.

Most airports and airlines have automatic readers that will verify the validity of the boarding pass at the jetway door or boarding gate. This also automatically updates the airline's database to show the passenger has boarded and the seat is used, and that the checked baggage for that passenger may stay aboard. This speeds up the paperwork process at the gate.

During security screenings, the personnel will also scan the boarding pass to authenticate the passenger.

Once an airline has scanned all boarding passes presented at the gate for a particular flight and knows which passengers actually boarded the aircraft, its database system can compile the passenger manifest for that flight.

== Bar-codes ==
Bar code on a boarding pass. Here shown in red, normally it is black for optimum readability.

BCBP (bar-coded boarding pass) is the name of the standard used by more than 200 airlines. BCBP defines the 2-dimensional (2D) bar code printed on a boarding pass or sent to a mobile phone for electronic boarding passes.

BCBP was part of the IATA Simplifying the Business program, which issued an industry mandate for all boarding passes to be barcoded. This was achieved in 2010.

Airlines and third parties use a barcode reader to read the bar codes and capture the data. Reading the bar code usually takes place in the boarding process but can also happen when entering the airport security checkpoints, while paying for items at the check-out tills of airport stores or trying to access airline lounges.

The standard was originally published in 2005 by IATA and updated in 2008 to include symbologies for mobile phones and in 2009 to include a field for a digital signature in the mobile bar codes. Future developments of the standard will include a near field communication format.

== Security concerns ==
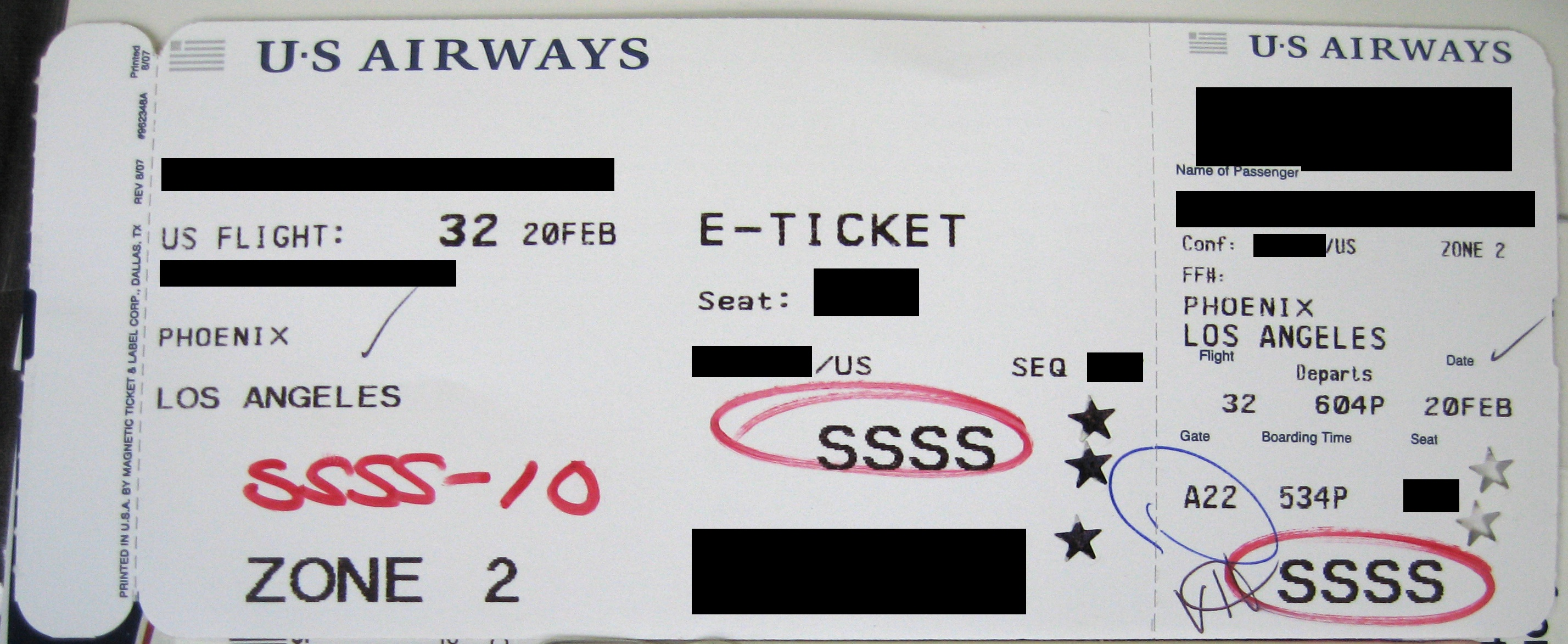
A US Airways boarding pass, featuring the initials SSSS, indicating that the passenger holding the pass has been selected for a Secondary Security Screening Selection check.

In recent years concerns have been raised both to the security of the boarding pass bar-codes, the data they contain and the PNR (Passenger Name Record) data that they link to. Some airline barcodes can be scanned by mobile phone applications to reveal names, dates of birth, source and destination airports and the PNR locator code, a 6-digit alphanumeric code also sometimes referred to as a booking reference number. This code plus the surname of the traveller can be used to log in to the airline's website, and access information on the traveller. In 2020, a photograph of a boarding pass posted by former Australian Prime Minister Tony Abbott on Instagram provided sufficient information to log in to Qantas's website. While not in and of itself problematic as the flight had happened in the past, the website (through its source code) unintentionally leaked private data not intended to be displayed directly, such as Abbott's passport number and Qantas's internal PNR remarks.

== Paper boarding passes ==
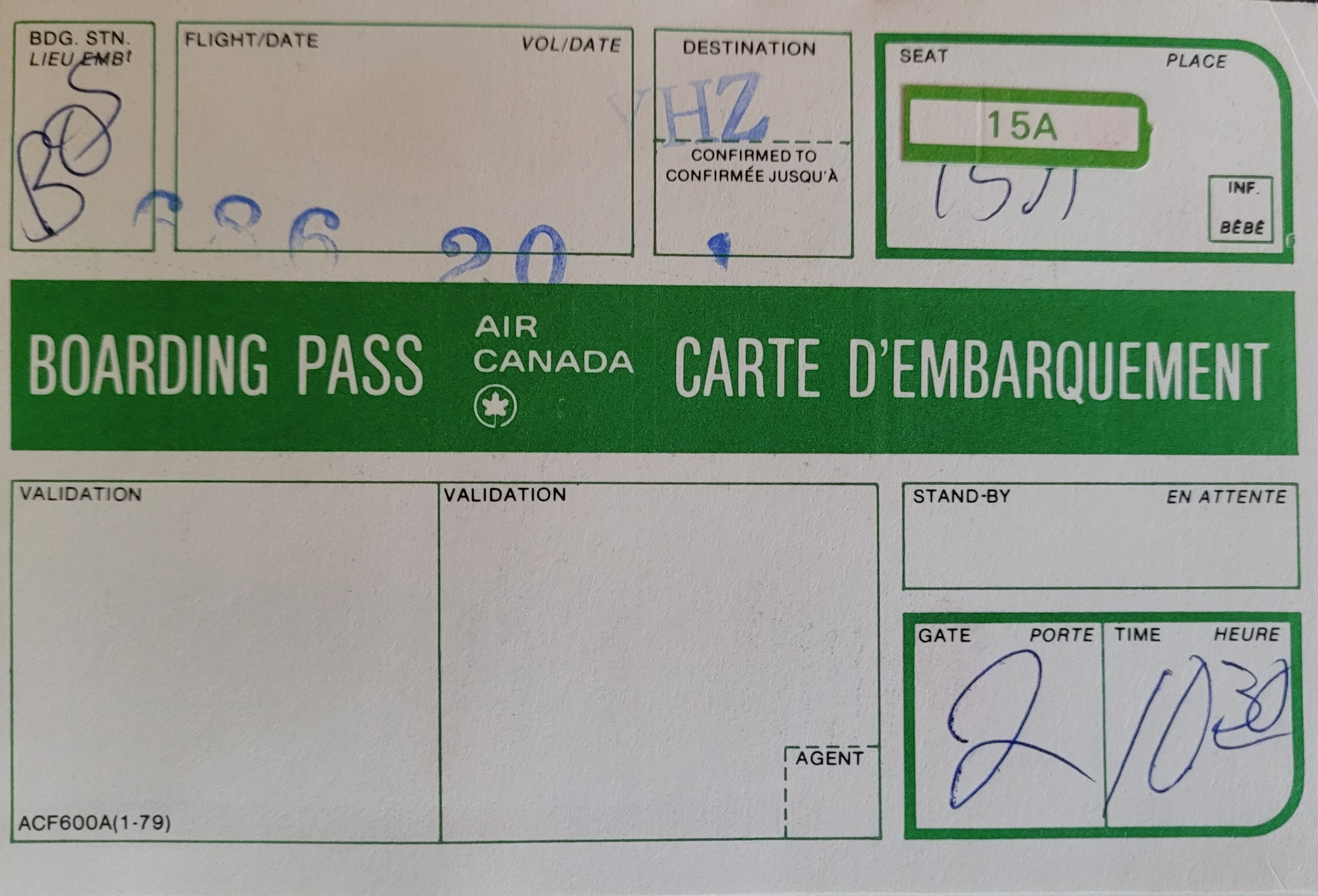
A handwritten Air Canada boarding pass from 1979

Paper boarding passes are issued either by agents at a check-in counter, self-service kiosks, or by the airline's web check-in site. BCBP can be printed at the airport by an ATB (Automated Ticket & Boarding Pass) printer or a direct thermal printer, or by a personal inkjet or laser printer. The symbology for paper boarding passes is PDF417. IATA's Board of Governors' mandate stated that all the IATA member airlines would be capable of issuing BCBP by the end of 2008, and all boarding passes would contain the 2D bar code by the end of 2010. The BCBP standard was published in 2005. It has been progressively adopted by airlines: By the end of 2005, 9 airlines were BCBP capable; 32 by the end of 2006; 101 by the end of 2007; and 200 by the end of 2008.

== Mobile boarding passes ==
Electronic boarding passes were "the industry's next major technological innovation after e-ticketing". According to SITA's Airline IT Trend Survey 2009, mobile BCBP accounted for 2.1% of use (vs. paper boarding passes), forecast rising to 11.6% in 2012.

=== Overview ===
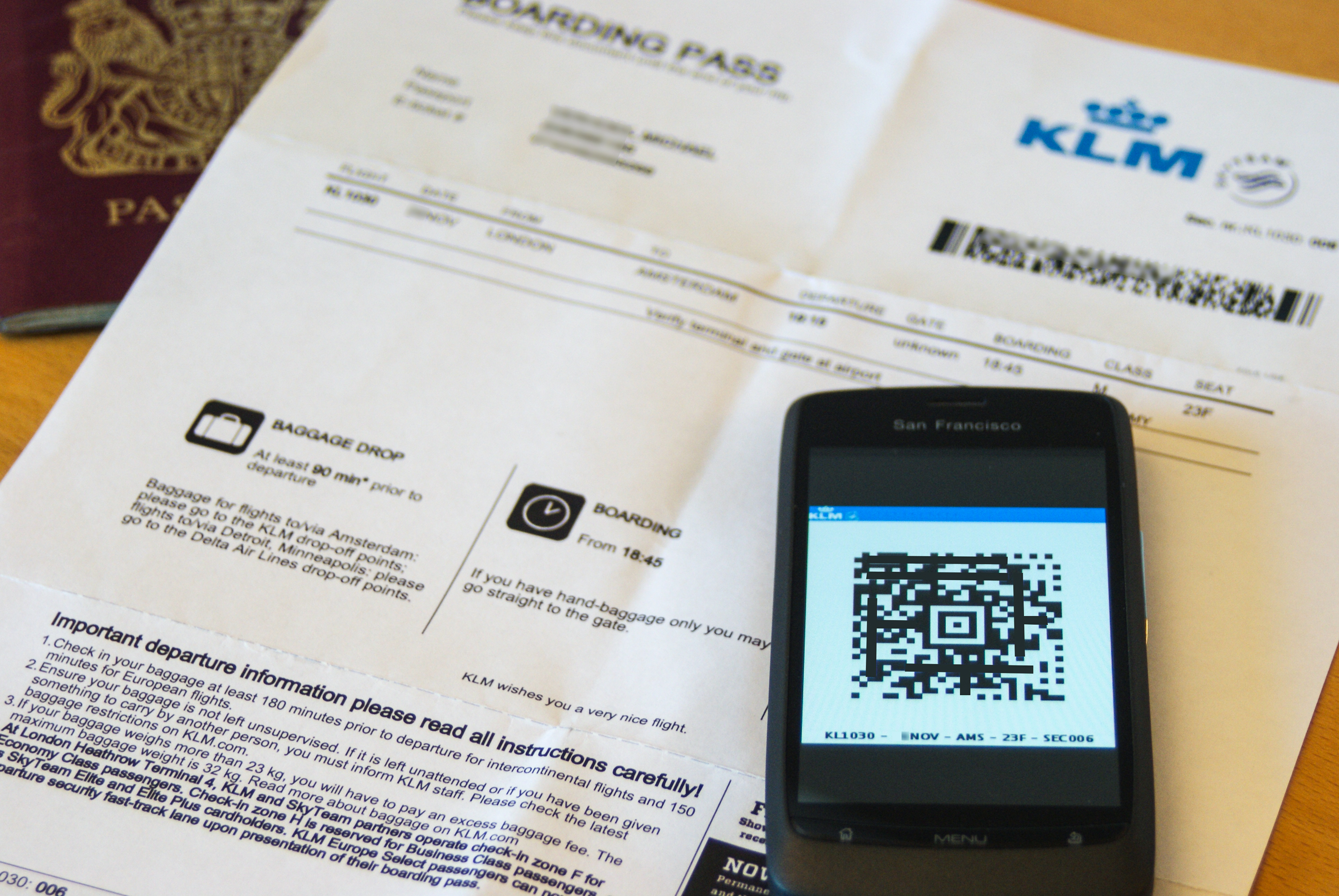
A mobile boarding pass and a paper boarding pass printed after online check-in.

Many airlines have moved to issuing electronic boarding passes, whereby the passenger checks in either online or via a mobile device, and the boarding pass is then sent to the mobile device as an SMS or e-mail. Upon completing an online reservation, the passenger can tick a box offering a mobile boarding pass. Most carriers offer two ways to get it: have one sent to mobile device (via e-mail or text message) when checking in online, or use an airline app to check in, and the boarding pass will appear within the application. In many cases, a passenger with a smartphone can add their boarding pass to their primary digital wallet app, such as Google Wallet, Samsung Wallet, or Apple Wallet. This way the passenger does not need to open the airline's dedicated app and shortly before the flight, the boarding pass appears on their device's home screen. Furthermore, a mobile boarding cards can be loaded into smart watches through the phones they are paired with.

The mobile pass is equipped with the same bar code as a standard paper boarding pass, and it is completely machine readable. The gate attendant simply scans the code displayed on the phone. IATA's BCBP standard defines the three symbologies accepted for mobile phones: Aztec code, Datamatrix and QR code. The United Nations International Telecommunication Union expected mobile phone subscribers to hit the 4 billion mark by the end of 2008.

=== Airlines using mobile boarding passes ===
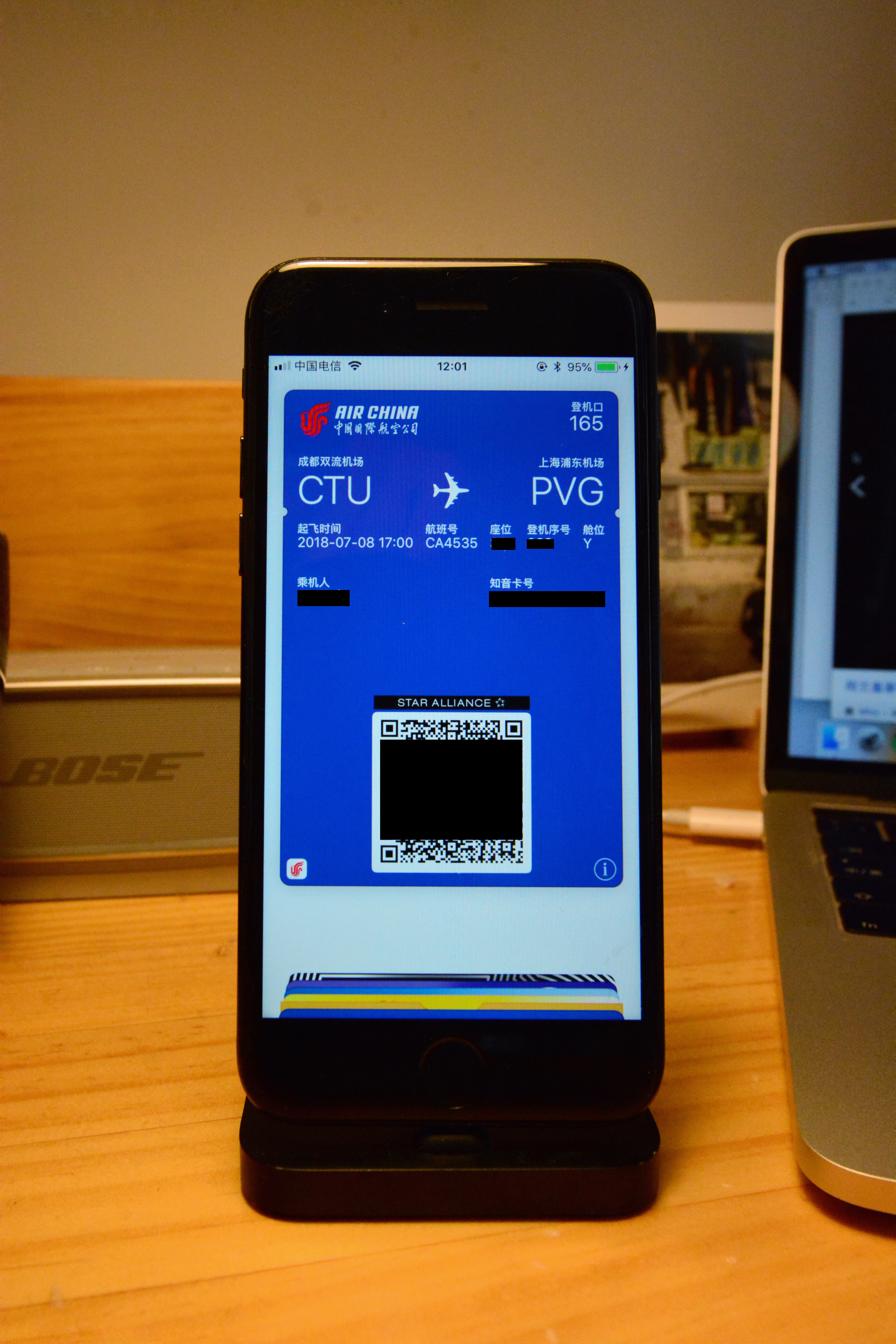
Electronic boarding pass of an Air China flight shown on iPhone 7

In September 2006, All Nippon Airways first began mobile boarding passes in Japan. Today, most major carriers offer mobile boarding passes at many airports.

In Europe, Lufthansa was one of the first airlines to launch Mobile BCBP in April 2008. In the US, the Transportation Security Administration runs a pilot program of a Boarding Pass Scanning System, using the IATA BCBP standard.

- On October 15, 2008, the TSA announced that scanners would be deployed within a year and scanning mobile BCBP would enable to better track wait times. The TSA keeps adding new pilot airports: Cleveland on October 23, 2008.
- On October 14, 2008, Alaska Airlines started piloting mobile boarding passes at Seattle Seatac Airport.
- On November 3, 2008, Air New Zealand launched the mpass, a boarding pass received on the mobile phone.
- On November 10, 2008, Qatar Airways launched their online check-in: passengers can have their boarding passes sent directly to their mobile phones.
- On November 13, 2008, American Airlines started offering mobile boarding passes at Chicago O'Hare Airport.
- On December 18, 2008, Cathay Pacific launched its mobile Check-in service, including the delivery of the barcode to the mobile phone.
- On February 24, 2009, Austrian Airlines begun offering paperless boarding passes to customers on selected routes.
- On April 16, 2009, SAS joined the mobile boarding pass bandwagon.
- On May 26, 2009, Air China offered its customers to receive a two-dimensional bar-code e-boarding pass on their mobile phone, with which they can go through security procedures at any channel at Beijing Airport Terminal 3, enabling a completely paperless check-in service.
- On October 1, 2009, Swiss introduced mobile boarding pass to its customers.
- On November 12, 2009, Finnair explained that "The mobile boarding pass system cuts passengers' carbon footprint by removing the need for passengers to print out and keep track of a paper boarding pass".
- On March 15, 2010, United began to offer mobile boarding passes to customers equipped with smartphones.
- In July/August 2014, Ryanair became the latest airline to offer mobile boarding passes to customers equipped with smartphones.

=== Benefits ===
- Practical: Travelers don't always have access to a printer, while not all airlines automatically print boarding passes during check-in, so choosing a mobile boarding pass eliminates the hassle of stopping at a kiosk at the airport.
- Ecological: Issuing electronic boarding passes is much more environmentally friendly than constantly using paper for boarding passes.

=== Drawbacks ===
- Using a mobile boarding pass is risky if one's phone battery runs out (rendering the boarding pass inaccessible) or if there are any problems reading the e-boarding pass.
- Using a mobile boarding pass can also be a challenge when traveling with multiple passengers on one reservation, because not all airline apps handle multiple mobile boarding passes. (However, some airlines, like Alaska Airlines, do allow users to switch between multiple boarding passes within their apps.)
- Some airlines (and even a few government authorities) may still require some paper portions of the boarding cards to be retained by staff. This is obviously not possible with a mobile boarding card.
- Some airlines need to stamp a boarding card after performing document verification checks on some passengers (e.g. Ryanair). Some airport authorities (e.g. Philippine immigration officers) also stamp the boarding card with the departure date. Passengers in turn have to present to staff their stamped boarding card at the gate to be allowed to board. As such, airlines may not extend the mobile boarding card feature to all its passengers within certain flights.

== Print-at-home boarding passes ==
A print-at-home boarding pass is a document that a traveller can print at home, at their office, or anywhere with an Internet connection and printer, giving them permission to board an airplane for a particular flight.

British Airways CitiExpress, the first to pioneer this self-service initiative, piloted it on its London City Airport routes to minimize queues at check-in desks, in 1999. The Civil Aviation Authority (CAA) approved the introduction of the 3D boarding pass in February 2000. Early adoption with passengers was slow, except for Business Travellers. However, the advent of low-cost carriers that charged for not using print-at-home boarding passes was the catalyst to shift consumers away from traditional at-airport check-in functions. This paved the way for British Airways to become the first global airline to deploy self-service boarding passes using this now ubiquitous technology.

Many airlines encourage travellers to check in online up to a month before their flight and obtain their boarding pass before arriving at the airport. Some carriers offer incentives for doing so (e.g., in 2015, US Airways offered 1000 bonus miles to anyone checking in online), while others charge fees for checking in or printing one's boarding pass at the airport.

=== Benefits ===
- Cost efficient for the airline – Passengers who print their own boarding pass reduce airline and airport staff, and infrastructure costs for check-in
- Passengers without baggage to drop do not have to drop by the check-in desk or self-service check-in machines at the airport and can go straight to security checks. Exceptions for this may be international passengers that require document verification (e.g. those that require a visa for their destination).

=== Problems ===
- Passengers have to remember to check-in in advance of their flight.
- Passengers need to have access to a printer and provide the paper and ink themselves or find printing points that already have them, to avoid being charged to print their boarding passes at the airport. Affordable access to printers equipped with paper and ink one can use to print one's boarding pass can be difficult to find while travelling away from home or their offices, although some airlines have responded by allowing passengers to check-in further in advance. Additionally, some hotels have computer terminals that allow passengers to access their airlines' website to print out boarding cards or passengers can email the boarding cards to the hotel's reception which can print it out for them.
- Some kinds of printers such as older dot matrix printers may not print the QR barcode portion legibly enough to be read accurately by the scanners.
- Some budget airlines which have moved towards passengers printing their boarding passes in advance may charge an unexpected hidden fee to print the boarding pass at the airport, often in excess of the cost of the flight itself. This, along with other such hidden costs, has led to allegations of false advertising and drip pricing being levelled towards the budget airlines in question.

=== Print-at-home boarding pass advertising ===
In a bid to boost ancillary revenue from other sources of in-flight advertising, many airlines have turned to targeted advertising technologies aimed at passengers from their departure city to their destination.

Print-at-home boarding passes display adverts chosen specifically for given travellers based on their anonymised passenger information, which does not contain any personally identifiable data. Advertisers are able to target specific demographic information (age range, gender, nationality) and route information (origin and destination of flight). The same technology can also be used to serve advertising on airline booking confirmation emails, itinerary emails, and pre-departure reminders.

=== Advantages of print-at-home boarding pass advertising ===
- Ability to use targeted advertising technologies to target messaging to relevant demographics and routes – providing travellers with offers that are likely to be relevant and useful
- High engagement level – research by the Global Passenger Survey has shown that on average, travellers look at their boarding pass over four times across 12 keytouch points in their journey
- The revenues airlines gain from advertising can help to offset operating costs and reduce ticket price rises for passengers

=== Concerns of print-at-home boarding pass advertising ===
- Some passengers find the advertising intrusive
- The advertising uses additional quantities of the passenger's ink when printing at home

== See also ==
- Airline ticket
- Check-in
- Secondary Security Screening Selection (SSSS rating)

== Bibliography ==
- Qantas boosts mobile device check-in options
- Northwest Airlines offer E-Boarding Pass functionality for their passengers
- Vueling: Now You Can Use Your Mobile as a Boarding Pass!
- Lufthansa offers mobile boarding pass worldwide
- Bar Coded Boarding Passes – Secure, Mobile and On the way
- Qatar launch mobile boarding pass service
- Mobile Boarding Pass Innovation Takes off with Qatar
- TSA Expands Paperless Boarding Pass Pilot Program to Additional Airports and Airlines
- Mobile boarding passes come to Barcelona Airport
- Spanair extend their mobile boarding pass service
