= Terrorist Screening Database =

FBI's central terrorist watchlist

The Terrorist Screening Database (TSDB) is the central terrorist watchlist consolidated by the Federal Bureau of Investigation's Threat Screening Center and used by multiple agencies to compile their specific watchlists and for screening. The list was created after the September 11 attacks.

== History, sources, uses, and scope ==
The TSDB is overseen by the FBI Threat Screening Center. It was created after the September 11 attacks. A 2007 report by the U.S. Department of Justice Office of the Inspector General stated that the TSDB, as the "U.S. Government's consolidated terrorist watchlist" contained "basic biographical information on known or appropriately suspected domestic and international terrorists" and that "the underlying derogatory information on individuals nominated for inclusion in the TSDB must demonstrate a reasonable suspicion of ties to terrorism." The main source of names for the TSDB is the Terrorist Identities Datamart Environment (TIDE), a database that as of 2013, contained between 700,000 and 1.1 million names.

The TSDB is massive in size and includes names of people identified as potential security risks. It is distinct from the much smaller No Fly List, a subset of the TSDB. (Note: In 2009, the FBI said that 9% of people included in the TSDB are also on the No Fly List. In 2014 congressional testimony, the director of the FBI's Terrorist Screening Center said, "The Terrorist Screening Center currently stands at about 800,000 identities. For those identities, for the No-Fly List, we are looking at about 8 percent of the overall population of the TSDB are watchlisted at the No-Fly level; about 3 percent of the overall population of the TSDB is watchlisted at the Selectee level.") Those on the TSDB are not actively monitored because doing so would be impracticable and would raise civil liberties issues. Those on the TSDB are not blocked from buying guns and are not automatically barred from boarding airplanes or traveling. In 2019, the government acknowledged that it shared its list with 1,441 non-governmental entities that were "in some way connected to the criminal justice system" such as campus police, hospital security staff, and private detention facilities; the admission alarmed some civil libertarian groups.

The purpose of the TSDB is to promote information-gathering and information sharing different agencies, and to flag individuals of interest for closer scrutiny when interacting with investigators or others, such as border agents or state police. TSDB data is categorized as sensitive but unclassified. The TSDB supports various other screening systems, such as the Transportation Security Administration's No Fly, Selectee, and Expanded Selectee Lists for airport security screening (lists which are much smaller subsets of the TSDB); the State Department's Consular Lookout and Support System (CLASS), used by consular officers for screening passport and visa applicants; U.S. Customs and Border Protection's TECS system, used for screening at border checkpoints; the FBI's "Known or Appropriately Suspected Terrorist File" (which is used by domestic law enforcement and is one of 21 files used by the FBI National Crime Information Center); the Defense Department (for screening of visitors to military bases). In 2021, a person familiar with the database told The Washington Post that the database has "silent hit" capability, so that if a person on the list is stopped by police (for example, for speeding), the event will be logged into the TSDB without the knowledge of the person who was stopped or even the officer who made the stop.

Although the government uses TSDB as both an investigative database and an "early warning" tool, inclusion on the list does not invariably prevent attacks or threats. For example, in October 2011, the FBI added Tamerlan Tsarnaev's name to the TSDB, before Tsarnaev committed the Boston Marathon bombings in April 2013. Omar Mateen was on the TSDB for a period of time before he committed the Pulse nightclub massacre. Dozens of people listed in TSDB, mostly those flagged in connection with past concerning white supremacist connections, were present in Washington, D.C., during the January 6, 2021 storming of the Capitol building.

The FBI does not publicly confirm or deny any individual's inclusion on the list.

=== Size of the list ===
In a 2008 hearing before the House Homeland Security Subcommittee on Transportation Security and Infrastructure Protection, the principal deputy director of the FBI's Terrorist Screening Center testified that the TSDB was updated daily and contained approximately 1 million records relating to 400,000 individuals, of whom 3% are U.S. persons (i.e., U.S. citizens and lawful permanent residents). The FBI official said that "A separate record is created for each name, alias and name variant. A single individual may have multiple records and the TSDB averages just over two records for every individual." According to 2009 data, approximately 1,600 nominations are suggested daily, 600 names are removed and 4,800 records are modified by the U.S. intelligence community.

By 2013, the TSDB included records relating to about 500,000 individuals. In 2014, the FBI stated that the TSDB included "about 800,000 identities."

As of 2017, there were about 1.16 million people on the TSDB; the great majority are foreigners, but the list also includes approximately 4,600 U.S. persons.

In December 2023, the TSDB had expanded to list almost 2 million people.

== Accuracy ==
The Justice Department's Office of Inspector General has criticized the list for frequent errors and slow response to complaints. An audit by the Office of Inspector General found that 38% of a 105 record sample contained inaccuracies. The Federal Bureau of Investigation has said it is redressing errors.

== Legal challenges ==
The U.S. Court of Appeals for the Fourth Circuit, Sixth Circuit, and Tenth Circuit have upheld the TSDB against legal challenges.

In 2019, in a case brought by a group of Muslim Americans against the government Judge Anthony Trenga of the U.S. District Court for the Eastern District of Virginia ruled that "the TSDB fails to provide constitutionally sufficient procedural due process, and thereby also violates the Administrative Procedure Act." The court based its ruling on the lack of an "independent review of a person's placement on the TSDB by a neutral decisionmaker" and the lack of an available remedy to fix mistakes, as persons listed "are not told whether or not they were or remain on the TSDB watchlist and are also not told the factual basis for their inclusion." In 2021, however, the U.S. Court of Appeals for the Fourth Circuit reversed the district court's ruling; in an opinion written by J. Harvie Wilkinson III, the court ruled that the TSDB's operation did not unlawfully burden the plaintiffs' right to travel given the government's compelling interest in national security and that "The delays and burdens experienced by plaintiffs at the border and in airports, although regrettable, do not mandate a complete overhaul of the TSDB."

== See also ==
- Integrated Automated Fingerprint Identification System (IAFIS)
- Travel technology
- Computer-Assisted Passenger Prescreening System
