= US signals intelligence in the Cold War =

After the end of World War II, all the Western allies began a rapid drawdown of military forces, including those of signals intelligence. At the time, the US still had a COMINT organization split between the Army and Navy. A 1946 plan listed Russia, China, and a [redacted] country as high-priority targets.

Each service ran independent agreements with foreign counterparts, some of which, especially the British, had already formed a central communications intelligence organization (e.g., the Government Code and Cypher School at Bletchley Park, now the Government Communications Headquarters). Lack of centralization bothered these allies. The vital British-US cooperation was, at this point, one of the strongest incentives to the US Army and Navy to form a centralized organization.

== US movement to centralization in SIGINT ==
The military services formed a "Joint Operating Plan" to cover 1946-1949, but this had its disadvantages. The situation became a good deal more complex with the passage of the National Security Act of 1947, which created a separate Air Force and Central Intelligence Agency, as well as unifying the military services under a Secretary of Defense. While the CIA remained primarily a consumer, the Air Force wanted its own SIGINT organization, responsive to its tactical and strategic needs, just as the Army and Navy often placed their needs beyond that of national intelligence. The Army Security Agency (ASA) had shared the national COMINT mission with the Navy's Communications Supplementary Activity (COMMSUPACT) - which became the Naval Security Group in June 1950. During and after World War II, a portion of Army COMINT assets was dedicated to support of the U.S. Army Air Corps, and, when the independent Air Force was created in 1947, these cryptologic assets were resubordinated to the new organization as the U.S. Air Force Security Service (AFSS).

Secretary of Defense James Forrestal rejected the early service COMINT unification plans. The Department of State objected to the next draft, which put the Central Intelligence Group/Central Intelligence Agency in charge of national COMINT. On 20 May 1949, Secretary of Defense Louis Johnson created the Armed Forces Security Agency.

To centralize common services, the Armed Forces Security Agency (AFSA) as a national organisation was established by secret executive order in 1948. Still, until NSA was formed in 1952, AFSA did not have the authority for central control of individual service COMINT and COMSEC. Policy direction of COMINT came from the U.S. Communications Intelligence Board (USCIB) which, in April 1949, requested $22 million in funds, including 1,410 additional civilian employees, to expand the COMINT effort.

== Pacific COMINT targeting prior to the Korean War ==
For the Pacific, the USCIB targeted China, and Russia in both the European and Pacific theaters, but Korea was a low-priority target: On its second-tier priority list were items of "high importance"; for the month prior to the war, Japan and Korea were item number 15 on the second list, but this did not focus on Korea itself. The specific requirements were "Soviet activities in North Korea", "North Korean-Chinese Communist Relations", and "North Korean-South Korean relations, including activities of armed units in border areas."

== Strategic SIGINT targeting of the USSR ==
In the fifties, only aircraft platforms could obtain SIGINT over the USSR. A Soviet source pointed out that aircraft were of limited usefulness, due to being vulnerable to fighters and antiaircraft weapons. (Translator's estimate: in the period 1950-1969, about 15 US and NATO reconnaissance aircraft were shot down over the USSR, China, the GDR and Cuba). The US, therefore, undertook the WS-117L reconnaissance satellite project, approved by President Dwight D. Eisenhower in 1954, within which was a signal intercept subsystem under Project PIONEER FERRET. By 1959, WS-117L had split into three programs:

1. Discoverer, the unclassified name for the CORONA IMINT satellite
2. Satellite and Missile Observation System (SAMOS) (IMINT)
3. Missile Defense Alarm System (MIDAS), a nonimaging staring infrared MASINT system

The first experimental ELINT package would fly aboard a photoreconnaissance satellite, Discoverer-13, in August 1960. Translated from the Russian, it was equipped with "Scotop equipment was intended to record the signals of Soviet radars which were tracking the flight of American space objects."

=== Loss of COMINT due to a spy in NSA ===
NSA in the post-World War II period had broken messages used by the Soviet armed forces, police and industry, and was building a remarkably complete picture of the Soviet national security posture. It was a situation that compared favorably to the successes of World War II. Then, during 1948, in rapid succession, every one of these cipher systems went dark, as a result of espionage by a Soviet agent, William Weisband. NSA suggests this may have been the most significant loss in US intelligence history.

== Indochina ==
The Viet Minh, at first, used captured French communications equipment. Under the French, no Vietnamese had been trained in cryptography, so, the initial messages were sent in the clear. On September 23, 1945, the US intercepted a message from Ho Chi Minh to Joseph Stalin, requesting aid for flood victims. This traffic immediately triggered more suspicion of Ho's relationship to Moscow, but it turned out to be one in a series of messages to world leaders.

On September 12, the Viet Minh established a Military Cryptographic Section, and, with their only reference a single copy of French Capitaine Roger Baudoin's Elements Cryptographic, and began to develop their own cryptosystems. Not surprisingly, these were very basic. By early 1946, they had established a network of radio systems, still transmitting with only minimal communications security.

The French had a number of direction-finding stations, with about 40 technicians. By 1946, the French had identified a number of Viet Minh networks and were able to do traffic analysis. They also monitored Nationalist and Communist Chinese, British, Dutch and Indonesian communications In general, however, SIGINT in French Indochina was limited by the availability of linguists.

While the US began to provide military supplies to the French, approximately at the time of the start of operations of the Armed Forces Security Agency in 1949, Indochina was a low COMINT priority. Even in 1950, the position of the French there was considered "precarious", both in a Joint Chiefs of Staff assessment and a National Intelligence Estimate.

== US domestic surveillance ==
During this period, several programs, potentially in violation of its foreign intelligence charter, the NSA (and its AFSA predecessor) monitored international telegram and selected voice communications of American citizens. Project SHAMROCK, started during the fifties under AFSA, the predecessor of NSA, and terminated in 1975, was a program in which NSA obtained copies, without a warrant, of telegrams sent by international record carriers. The related Project MINARET intercepted voice communications of persons of interest to US security organizations of the time, including Malcolm X, Jane Fonda, Joan Baez, and Martin Luther King.

== Drone technology grows ==
While there were remote-controlled aircraft in World War II, the technology of the time was inadequate for reliable operation as demonstrated by Operation Aphrodite. This began to change in 1948, when Ryan won the U.S. Air Force competition for the Q-2 jet-propelled aerial target. Known as the Q-2A Firebee, the jet-propelled target drone ground-launched by rocket and recovered by parachute was also bought by the Navy and Army.

Drones did not have an immediate SIGINT role, but they became important in later conflicts and the Firebee drone was soon to be developed into the Ryan Model 147 series which saw extensive use in the Vietnam War.

== Korean War ==
Korean coverage was incidental to Soviet and Chinese interests in the Korean Peninsula.

SIGINT gave some indications of an impending breakout prior to the beginning of the Korean War. As with the retrospective analysis of COMINT immediately after Pearl Harbor, certain traffic would have been suggestive. Before the invasion, targeting was against Chinese and Soviet targets with incidental mention of Korea. Prior to 1950 there were two COMINT hints of more than usual interest in the Korean peninsula by communist bloc nations, but neither was sufficient to provide specific warning of a June invasion.

In April 1950, ASA undertook a limited "search and development" study of DPRK traffic. Two positions the second case, as revealed in COMINT, large shipments of bandages and medicines went from the USSR to North Korea and Manchuria, starting in February 1950. These two actions made sense only in hindsight, after the invasion of South Korea occurred in June 1950.

Some North Korean communications were intercepted between May 1949 and April 1950 because the operators were using Soviet communications procedures. Coverage was dropped once analysts confirmed the non-Soviet origin of the material.

Within a month of the North Korean invasion, the JCS approved the transfer of 244 officers and 464 enlisted men to AFSA and recommended a large increase in civilian positions. In August, the DoD comptroller authorized an increase of 1,253 additional civilian COMINT positions. Given the administration's belief that the war in Korea could be part of a wider war, only some of the increase would go to direct support of the war in Korea.

COMINT, supported by information from other open and secret sources, showed a number of other military-related activities, such as VIP visits and communications changes, in the Soviet Far East and in the PRC, but none was suspicious in itself. Even when consolidated by AFSA in early 1951, these activities as a whole did not provide clear evidence that a significant event was imminent, much less a North Korean invasion of the South.

In 1952, when personnel levels and a more static war allowed some retrospective analysis, AFSA reviewed unprocessed intercept from the June 1950 period. Analysts could not find any message which would have given advance warning of the North Korean invasion. One of the earliest, if not the earliest, messages relating to the war, dated June 27 but not translated until October, referred to division level movement by North Korean forces.

=== Tactical SIGINT ===
UN forces in the Korean War had an assortment of SIGINT units from the various services. On the ground, mountainous terrain, and short supplies of radios among North Korean troops, caused the 1951 reuse of World War I telephone eavesdropping techniques called Ground Return Intercept (GRI). One colonel who participated in the GRI program was heard to remark that the information was so well appreciated by his soldiers that he had little trouble getting volunteers to go out at night and implant the equipment to make intercept possible, even though the sensors might need to be as close as 35 yards (32 m) to the enemy.

Starting in July 1951, Low-level intercept (LLI) teams, of 2-5 men in a jeep or bunker, became popular. Although the mobile operations were productive, the jeeps were considered too vulnerable, and operations were "dug in" in bunkers near the Main Line of Resistance, as it was then called. The product was disseminated directly to combat units, usually at regimental level, and was of immediate tactical value: from twenty minutes to three days at best.

Little long-term analysis was done - or possible. It thus became difficult to keep continuity on opposing units. These problems were eased somewhat with the creation of an LLI "control section" at ASA headquarters in Seoul in late 1951. This section collated reports from the field and service as a reference source on language problems and OB questions.

=== Postwar changes in SIGINT, EW and ELINT ===
The Service Cryptologic Agencies still had their own identity, even after the formation of NSA.

In 1955, ASA took over electronic intelligence (ELINT) and electronic warfare functions previously carried out by the Signal Corps. Since its mission was no longer exclusively identified with intelligence and security, ASA was withdrawn from G-2 control and resubordinated to the Army Chief of Staff as a field operating agency.

Under the US Marines, the 1st Composite Radio Company was activated on 8 September 1959, continuing the World War II legacy.

President Harry Truman, on 24 October 1952, issued a directive that set the stage for the National Security Agency, whose scope went beyond the pure military. NSA was created on 4 November 1952.

=== Air Force support ===
Air Force SIGINT, by the Air Force Security Service, supported numerous Korean War operations. They often gave early warning of bombing attacks or ambushes for fighter aircraft. Since the North Koreans operated under Soviet doctrine, with strict ground control, the ground-controlled interception communications were especially vulnerable. North Korean orders to bombing units might well be intercepted and processed in the US system, before they reached the enemy units. Both ground sites and aircraft intercepted North Korean communications.

An AFSS intercept site, established, in 1951, on Paengyong-do Island, brought sensitive equipment and personnel unacceptably close to the enemy. Security concerns led to the site being abandoned. This served as a feasibility demonstration, and a new, more secure facility was placed on Cho-Do Island. Cho-Do provided both tactical and strategic SIGINT, and a key officer, Delmar Lang, later used the same techniques in Vietnam.

After the Chinese entry into the war, Air Force COMINT, sometimes of tactical communications, allowed UN commanders to prepare for Chinese attacks. Chinese radio communications were limited to higher headquarters, so the UN often knew plans before the unit executing the plan.

== Indochina and Vietnam to 1954 ==
"After abolition of the French Indochina opium monopoly in 1950, SDECE imposed centralized, covert controls over the illicit drug traffic that linked the Hmong poppy fields of Laos with the opium dens operating in Saigon." This generated profits that funded French covert operations in French Indochina".

In the spring and fall of 1951, French forces beat back Viet Minh attacks, but continued to be increasingly hard-pressed in 1953. While the NSA history is heavily redacted, it appears that the French may have provided COMINT to the CIA.

In 1953, the French began their strongpoint at Dien Bien Phu, for reasons the NSA history said were unclear. Factors may have included controlling some restive tribal groups, or, having seen the effect of US firepower in Korea, hoped to draw the Viet Minh into a similar killing zone. The history mentioned the possibility that the French intelligence service did not want to lose a profitable opium operation in the area, but suggested it was more likely that the Viet Minh were making a profit in this area.

Again concealed by heavy redactions in the NSA history, it appeared that the French had intelligence of multiple Viet Minh units in the Dien Bien Phu area, but no good idea of their size. The overall commander, Henri Navarre, rejected the possibility that these units could be of division size, and that the Viet Minh was capable of a multidivisional operation against Dien Bien Phu.

The NSA history indicates, although the sources and methods are redacted, that the US had very good data on both sides at Dien Bien Phu. As the position crumbled, the French apparently thought that they could get combat assistance from the US. Only the heading of that an NSA emergency force was being considered survived redaction. Nevertheless, while some of the Joint Chiefs did recommend a US relief expedition, President Dwight Eisenhower, as well as Gen. Matthew Ridgway, having just come from the Korean command, rejected the idea of another land war in Asia.

== US Submarine SIGINT begins ==
Under the code names HOLYSTONE, PINNACLE, BOLLARD, and BARNACLE, began in 1959, US submarines infiltrated Soviet harbors to tap communications cables and gather SIGINT. They also had a MASINT mission against Soviet submarines and missiles. The program, which went through several generations, ended when compromised, by Ronald Pelton, in 1981.

== 1960s ==
SIGINT had much operational impact during this period, with the Cuban Missile Crisis, steady ramping up of warfare in Southeast Asia, and US domestic surveillance. Aircraft, UAV, ship, and ground SIGINT all were in use, and satellite technology left the experimental stage.

=== Drones evolve further and the impact of the EC-121 shootdown ===
The Ryan Q-2A evolved into the Q-2C Firebee target drone of 1960 which remains in active service. In 1961, the Air Force requested a reconnaissance version of the Firebee then designated the BQM-34A which resulted in the Ryan Model 147 (later to be designated AQM-34 by USAF). This RPV (Remotely Piloted Vehicle, terminology of that era for UAV) looked like its target version, but carried more fuel and had a new navigation system. Like all subsequent versions of this RPV, it was air launched from beneath the wing of a specially modified Lockheed DC-130 Hercules, rather than ground-launched with rocket assistance. These are thought to have been operationally for IMINT, although SIGINT was considered, as more U.S. aerial reconnaissance platforms perform SIGINT than IMINT and most IMINT platforms, such as the U-2 and SR-71, also have SIGINT capability. Drones of this version were made ready to be used in the Cuban Missile Crisis, but stood down on order from General LeMay.

A major advance for high-risk IMINT and SIGINT missions was the high-altitude AQM-34N, which flew as high as 70,000 feet (21,000 m) and had a range over 2,400 miles (3,900 km). AQM-34Ns flew 138 missions between March 1967 and July 1971, and 67% were parachute-recovered with the new mid-air retrieval system, which used a helicopter to grab the parachute cable in mid-air. While this had an IMINT mission, the potential of high altitude for SIGINT over a wide area was obvious.

In the EC-121 shootdown incident of 15 April 1969, an EC-121M of the U.S. Navy's Fleet Airborne Reconnaissance Squadron One (VQ-1) Vietnam, took off on a routine SIGINT patrol under the BEGGAR SHADOW program. North Korean air search radar was monitored by the USAF 6918th Security Squadron in Japan, and Detachment 1 6922nd Security Wing at Osan Air Base in Korea, and the Naval Security Group at Kamiseya, Japan. The EC-121M was not escorted. When US radar detected the takeoff of North Korean interceptors, and the ASA unit lost touch, ASA called for fighters, but the EC-121M never again appeared on radar. 31 crewmen were lost.

In response to this threat on what had been considered a low-risk mission, Ryan was tasked to develop the AQM-34Q SIGINT (known as COMBAT DAWN) version of the AQM-34P RPV, with antennas along the fuselage. Underwing fuel tanks were added to this model, and the AQM-34R updated the electronics and had standard underwing tanks.

=== Early space-based SIGINT ===
Soviet sources state the first specialized ELINT satellites, which received the designation of "Ferret", was begun in the US in 1962. In actuality, the first successful SIGINT satellite was the U.S. Navy's Galactic Radiation and Background (GRAB), designed by the U.S. Naval Research Laboratory. GRAB had an unclassified experiment called Solrad, and an ELINT package called Tattletale. Tattletale was also called Canes; CANES was also the National Reconnaissance Office (NRO) sensitive compartmented information (SCI) codeword for the control system overall program. GRAB intercepted radar pulses as they came over the horizon, translated the frequency, and retransmitted each pulse, with no further processing, to ground receiving sites. GRAB operated from 1960 to 1962. Again examining space-based SIGINT through Soviet eyes, "The tasks of space-based SIGINT were subdivided into two groups: ELINT against antiaircraft and ABM radars (discovery of their location, operating modes and signal characteristics) and SIGINT against C3 systems. In order to carry out these tasks the US developed ... satellites of two types:

- small ELINT satellites which were launched together with photoreconnaissance satellites into initially low orbits and then raised into a polar working orbit at an altitude of 300 to 800 km using on-board engines
- heavy (1 to 2 tonne mass) "SIGINT" (possibly the translator's version of COMINT?) satellites, which were put into orbit at an altitude of around 500 km using a Thor-Agena booster. The Soviet source described the satellites of the late sixties as "Spook Bird" or CANYON, which was the predecessor to the production RHYOLITE platforms. This was not completely correct if the Soviets thought these were heavy ELINT satellites; CANYON was the first COMINT satellite series, which operated from 1968 to 1977.

According to the NRO, the incremental upgrade of GRAB's Tattletale package was POPPY. The second program, Poppy, operated from 1962 to 1977. The "fact of" the Poppy program, along with limited technical information, was declassified in 2004. At least three NRO operators did the preliminary processing of the POPPY data, one measuring the orbital elements of the satellite and the selected polarization, while the second operator identified signals of interest. The third operator did more detailed, non-real-time, analysis of the signal, and transmitted information to NSA.

Before GRAB and POPPY, US information about Soviet radar stopped about 200 miles (320 km) from the coastline. After these space systems went into service, effectively all radars on the Soviet landmass became known to NSA. They informed the Strategic Air Command with the technical details and locations of air defense radars, which went into planning attack routes of the Single Integrated Operational Plan (SIOP), the master set of plans for nuclear warfare. They provided operational information to Navy commanders. Coupled with IMINT from CORONA, they helped CIA, DIA and other elements of the intelligence community understand the overall Soviet threat.

=== The Cuban Crisis and the hotter part of the Cold War ===
While the start of the Cuban Missile Crisis came from IMINT showing Soviet missiles under construction, SIGINT had had an earlier role in suggesting that increased surveillance of Cuba might be appropriate. NSA had intercepted suspiciously blank shipping manifests to Cuba, and, through 1961, there was an increasing amount of radio chatter suggestive of Cuba receiving both Soviet weapons and personnel. The weapons could be used offensively as well as defensively.

In September and October 1962, SIGINT pointed to the completion of a current Soviet air defense network in Cuba, presumably to protect something. The key U-2 flight that spotted the ballistic missiles took place on October 15. While the IMINT organizations were most critical, an anecdote of the time, told by Juanita Moody, the lead SIGINT specialist for Cuba, that the newly appointed Director of NSA, LTG Gordon Blake, came by to see if he could help. "She asked him to try to get additional staff to meet a sudden need for more personnel. Shortly she heard him on the telephone talking to off-duty employees: "This is Gordon Blake calling for Mrs. Moody. Could you come in to work now?"

Two RB-47H aircraft of the 55th Reconnaissance Wing were modified during the Cuban Missile Crisis to work with Ryan Model 147 RPVs (Remotely Piloted Vehicle, terminology of that era for UAV) launched from DC-130s. The RPVs carried deceptive signal generators that made them appear to be the size of a U-2, and also carried receivers and relays for the Soviet SA-2 surface-to-air missiles on Cuba. In real time, the RPVs relayed the information to the RB-47 which was itself using ELINT sensors against the radar and SA-2 command frequencies. The RPV was essentially carrying out a "ferret" probe intended to provoke defensive response, but not jeopardizing the lives of pilots. This full capability was only ready in 1963, and the original scenario no longer held.

During the Crisis, after a U-2 was shot down, RB-47Hs of the 55th Wing began flying COMMON CAUSE missions with other U.S. aircraft to identify any Cuban site that fired on a U.S. plane. The Cubans, however believed the U.S. threat that such a site would immediately be attacked and withheld their fire. As a result, crews began calling the mission "Lost Cause".

Tactical Naval SIGINT monitored stopped Soviet transports, when it was unknown if they would challenge the naval quarantine. Direction finding confirmed they had turned around.

=== CIA SIGINT ===
Also in 1962, the Central Intelligence Agency, Deputy Directorate for Research, formally took on ELINT and COMINT responsibilities. "The consolidation of the ELINT program was one of the major goals of the reorganization....it is responsible for:

- Research, development, testing, and production of ELINT and COMINT collection equipment for all Agency operations.
- Technical operation and maintenance of CIA deployed non-agent ELINT systems.
- Training and maintenance of agent ELINT equipment
- Technical support to the Third Party Agreements.
- Data reduction of Agency-collected ELINT signals.
- ELINT support peculiar to the penetration problems associated with the Agent's reconnaissance program under NRO.
- Maintain a quick reaction capability for ELINT and COMINT equipment."

"CIA's Office of Research and Development was formed to stimulate research and innovation testing leading to the exploitation of non-agent intelligence collection methods....All non-agent technical collection systems will be considered by this office and those appropriate for field deployment will be so deployed. The Agency's missile detection system, Project [deleted] based on backscatter radar is an example. This office will also provide integrated systems analysis of all possible collection methods against the Soviet antiballistic missile program is an example.". It is not clear where ELINT would end and MASINT would begin for some of these projects, but the role of both is potentially present. MASINT, in any event, was not formalized as a US-defined intelligence discipline until 1986.

=== US operations in Southeast Asia ===
The NSA History redacted most information, not already public, from 1954 to 1960. A section is titled "Diem's War against Internal Dissent". It opens with an observation that most opposition to President Diem was inflamed by "his program of wholesale political suppression, not just of the Viet Minh cadre that had stayed in the south after Geneva, but against all opposition, whether it was communist or not." By mid-1955, according to Diem, approximately 100,000 Communists were alleged to have surrendered, or rallied to Diem, although the NSA author suggests this did not correspond to political reality, since there were only an estimated 10,000 "stay-behinds". It was clear, however, that the number of communists at large dropped dramatically.

==== SIGINT in Southeast Asia, 1954-1960 ====
The history mentions that his security organs were given a free hand by Ordnance Number 6 of January 1956, putting anyone deemed a threat to the defense of the state and public safety", at least in house arrest. A quote from Life magazine, generally considered friendly to Diem, suggested that a substantial number of non-communists had been arrested. This is followed by a brief note, "Yet in that same process of neutralizing opposition, Diem set the seeds for his own downfall." This followed by long redactions. Both Diem and the US Military Assistance Advisory Group (MAAG), according to the NSA history, felt the communists were going into "last gasps" in late 1959.

US SIGINT support during the Vietnam War came principally from service cryptographic units, with some NSA coordination. Units still belonged to their parent service, such as the Army Security Agency and Naval Security Group. Some SIGINT personnel were assigned to covert special operations and intelligence units.

==== Structuring the history of SIGINT and Southeast Asia ====
There are several ways to split US SIGINT regarding Southeast Asia into periods. Gilbert's four periods are focused on the deployment of American units. In contrast, Hanyok's periods, although the redactions make it difficult to see exactly why he created chapters as he did, but it would appear that he ties them more to VC/NVA activities, as well as RVN politics, than the US view.

==== SIGINT and the Development of NVA Logistics ====
For example, the NVA decision to create the 559th Group and establish the Ho Chi Minh trail, about which there seems to have been significant SIGINT, was in May 1959, the reason for the Group's number. Additional transportation groups were created for maritime supply to the South: Group 759 ran sea-based operations, while Group 959 supplied the Pathet Lao by land routes. Gilbert does not consider the dates of creation of the logistics groups, nor does he consider Hanyok's history before US combat troops arrived, but those earlier periods were not his focus. Group 959 also provided secure communications to the Pathet Lao.

Initial Emphasis on Laos

Hanyok emphasizes that the US, in the early 1960s, considered Laos, not South Vietnam, the critical area. The Department of Defense prepared alternative operational plans for US combat troops in Laos and Thailand. To support this, "a Laotian Watch Office was set up with twenty-four-hours-a-day operations, seven days a week. A special TDY [temporary duty] team was readied to fly to the ASA site at Clark Air Base to set up a second-echelon SIGINT reporting mission. (SIGINT reporting can be performed at various levels, or echelons. Field site reporting is considered first-echelon. If a unit has no reporting capability, then its intercept is forward to an intermediate site that is considered "second-echelon")". The Laotian situation calmed, but flared again in May 1962. The US again prepared a combat force, made of Seventh Fleet ships that sailed into the Gulf of Siam. A battalion of Marines was airlifted to Udon, to supplement forces already there. NSA again went to a theaterwide SIGINT condition BRAVO, including at the year-old ASA facility at Tan Son Nhut airbase near Saigon.

DRV Logistics and the Ho Chi Minh Trail

Another heading in the NSA history is "Military Group 559, the Construction of the Ho Chi Minh Trail, and the Southern Infiltration 1959-1962". Hanyok explains that the Trail constantly improved, until, by 1974, it was a network of all-weather roads, trails, and pipelines. Again, Hanyok divides the history into periods based on enemy action, while Gilbert divides it on American deployments and changes in technology.

Hanyok writes that the 559th was variously known as a Transportation Group, Division, or Regiment. It had two subordinate regiments, the 70th and 71st, composed of truck, roadbuilding, and other operational functions. The 559th itself was subordinated to the General Directorate Rear Services (GDRS). From the SIGINT standpoint, the Trail began at two major supply-heads, Vinh Linh and Đồng Hới, which were the intermediate headquarters running the infiltration-associated radio nets from 1959 until late 1963. They disappeared in September 1963, although Vinh Linh became the headquarters of the 559th.

==== Early days: American and Operational Perspective ====
In January 1961, while the Vietnam embassy and military group prepared a counterinsurgency plan, the SIGINT community did its own planning. The first review of the situation assumed limited support to the ARVN COMINT teams. Essentially, the policy was that the South Vietnamese would be trained in basic direction finding using "known or derived" technical information, but, for security reasons, COMINT that involved more sophisticated analysis would not be shared. It was also felt that for at least the near term, ARVN COMINT could not provide meaningful support, and the question was presented, to the State Department, if it was politically feasible to have US direction-finding teams operate inside South Vietnam. The March 1961 plan included both tactical support and a strategic COMINT mission collection NVA data for NSA.

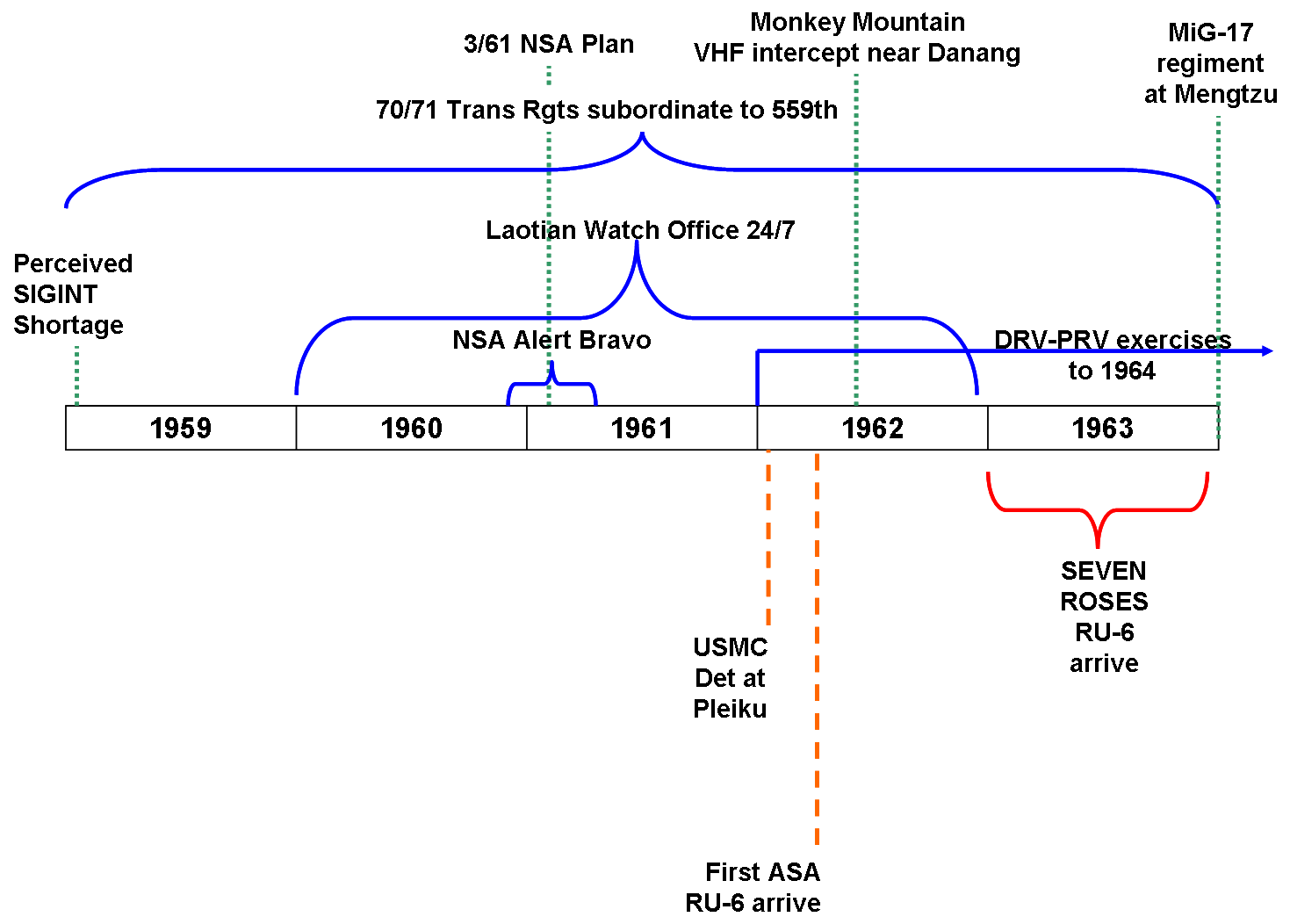
Significant events, 1959-1963. Hanyok is the source above the years and Gilbert below them.

Eventually, the idea was that the South Vietnamese could intercept, but send the raw material to the US units for analysis. Two plans were created, WHITEBIRCH to increase US capability throughout the region but emphasizing South Vietnam, and SABERTOOTH to train ARVN personnel in basic COMINT. Concerns over ARVN security limited the information given them to non-codeword SECRET information. The first step in WHITEBIRCH was the 400th ASA Special Operations Unit (Provisional), operating under the cover name of the 3rd Radio Research Unit (RRU).

The 3rd RRU soon had its first casualty, SP4 James T. Davis, killed in an ambush. Soon, it was realized that thick jungle made tactical ground collection exceptionally dangerous, and direction-finding moved principally to aircraft platforms.

Although SIGINT personnel were present in 1960, Gilbert breaks the ASA involvement in Vietnam into four chronological phases, which do not match the more recent NSA history by Hanyok, which is less focused on events with the US military.

1. The Early Years: 1961-1964, characterized by direction-finding and COMSEC, ending with the Gulf of Tonkin Incident. This partially overlaps the period of "SIGINT and the Attempted Coups against Diem, 1960-1962"
2. The Buildup: 1965-1967, with cooperation at the Corps/Field Force level, and the integration of South Vietnamese linguists. Major ASA units at this time were the 509th Radio Research Group and 403d RR (Radio Research) SOS (Special Operations Detachment)
3. Electronic Warfare: 1968-1970, with substantial technical experimentation
4. Vietnamization: 1971-1973, as the mission shifted back to training, advising, and supporting South Vietnamese units.
Early Air Force strategic SIGINT

DC-130 launchers and controllers were deployed to Kadena in Okinawa, and to Bien Hoa in Vietnam. The real-time telemetry, hoped for during the Cuban crisis, was now a reality, and RB-47H ELINT aircraft were dedicated to Southeast Asian operations.

RC-135Ms were flying at the same time, but primarily against China and Russia. Eventually, their missions focused on Southeast Asia.

First-generation Army tactical SIGINT aircraft

RU-6A Beaver aircraft equipped with airborne radio direction finders (ARDF) were the first Army reconnaissance aircraft in South Vietnam, arriving in March 1962 and assigned to the Flight Detachment of the 3rd Radio Research Unit. More RU-6A's, now code named SEVEN ROSES, arrived in 1963, along with RU-5D Seminoles with the code name CHECKMATE, and a RU-8F.

Initial direction finding was unsatisfactory, and various additional aircraft were added, including more RU-6A and RU-8Ds, a single RCV-2B Caribou codenamed PATHFINDER, a RU-1A Otter coded CAFE GIRL, and RU-1As under the codes HAPPY NIGHTS and LAFFING OTTER. CHECKMATE, with AN/ARD-15 surveillance equipment, proved successful, and was extended to the Beavers and the U-8Ds.

Marine SIGINT

The USMC 1st Composite Radio Company deployed, on January 2, 1962, to Pleiku, South Vietnam as Detachment One under the command of then Captain John K. Hyatt, Jr. On September 17, 1963 it was redesignated as 1st Radio Company, Kaneohe Bay, Hawaii. 1st Radio Battalion - 14 July 1964, but apparently still put detachments into Vietnam.

Upgraded to the 1st Radio Battalion, Fleet Marine Force (FMF), in Hawaii in July 1964, it deployed to Da Nang as 1st Radio Battalion, FMF, Camp Horn, Da Nang, South Vietnam

==== Early Days: Vietnamese and Strategic perspective ====
1960, however, opened with a "disaster for the South Vietnamese" in Tay Ninh Province, followed by a number of battles lost. To SIGINT analysts at NSA, the increase in communications activity in 1960 indicated a strong growth of the communists. By the end of the year, NSA estimated that the number of stations had quadrupled, with the communications activity in the Saigon area growing sixfold or sevenfold. The increased communications activity, according to the history, was so striking that Allen W. Dulles, the Director of Central Intelligence and head of the intelligence community, personally went to President John F. Kennedy, in January 1961, to brief him on the increase.

SIGINT and the Attempted Coups against Diem, 1960–1962

A section entitled "SIGINT and the Attempted Coups against Diem, 1960-1962", opens, on 11 November 1961, with the sounds of a coup attempt in Saigon. "Diem's luck held. The coup leaders were disorganized and amateurish. Rather than seize the palace [where Diem and his brother were barricaded], they preferred to talk. They also failed to capture the radio stations and other communications centers and failed to set up roadblocks..." and other obstacles to loyalist troops, who caused the coup members to flee, often to Cambodia. "American SIGINT had been surprised by the coup, as had American intelligence in general. In the coup's aftermath, SIGINT discovered, through decrypted VC regional headquarters messages, that the communists were taking an active interest in the failed coup, learning valuable lessons from its shortcomings, which would translate into plans to take advantage of any future maneuvers against Diem.

Intercepts also made it clear that the attempted coup by paratroopers had surprised the Communists as much as Diem. "In the mad scramble for positioning that followed, the Viet Cong in the Nam Bo [Saigon] region directed subordinate elements to help soldiers, officers and others (politicians and security personnel) involved in the coup to escape." This was followed by long redactions, and then the question, "Were the Communists on to something? There is no doubt that they were correct in their assessment that the Americans were disillusioned with Diem's failure to select a course of social reform and stick with it." They believed the Americans were contacting dissidents and planning new coups, but NSA states there was no evidence of American involvement; the South Vietnamese were more than capable of planning their own.

Creation of the National Liberation Front

On 20 December 1960, the National Liberation Front (NLF) was established. "the formation of the NLF probably marked the final eclipse for any viable, independent, noncommunist and nationalist alternative to Diem's rule. As far back as the 1930s, noncommunist nationalist organizations had essentially been destroyed by the French colonial security (Sûreté) apparatus." Nationalist alternatives to the Communists or Diem had not been a viable option for decades.

Alerts over Soviet and Chinese Airlift

While much text was redacted, the NSA history indicates there was major concern, in December 1960, about a Soviet airlift of supplies, and a "real concern that either the Soviets or the Chinese Communists, or both, would go beyond the supply flights and directly intervene in the fighting. On 14 December 1960, the NSA director, VADM Laurence L. Frost, institute a SIGINT Readiness Condition BRAVO on a theaterwide level throughout the Far East." The nature of BRAVO was not given, and the theater went back to ALPHA, apparently the lowest, by February 1961, when the intelligence community (IC) decided there was no chance the Soviets or PRC would join the fighting.

America Plans the Mainland SIGINT Buildup, [deleted]-1961

By late 1960, the SIGINT community was detecting increased activity in South Vietnam and Laos, and there were not enough assets to meet the needs for intelligence. A section headed "America Plans the Mainland SIGINT Buildup, [deleted]-1961" begins with a statement that in 1959, "the problem of American cryptology in Southeast Asia could be seen by looking at a map of SIGINT sites in the larger Asian region." After over a page of deleted material, it was said that most coverage came from three sites in the Philippines, which provided about 450 hours per month of monitoring the DRV. After deletions, the comment is made that the "more general traffic analysis situation was deemed barely sufficient to establish a "skeletal" technical continuity for radio station and network identification and provide data for a realistic estimate of the total communist communications problem. Direction finding support for the DRV transmitters was "insignificant"". I can be suggested that since the material after the redactions spoke of traffic analysis as more general, the redacted sections dealt with message content interception, cryptanalysis, and translation.

While the methods were not yet called MASINT, there was a Special Identification Techniques (SIT) facility at the ASA site at Clark AFB could use to do "radio fingerprinting" to recognize unique Morse code operator "fists". This revealed little, and the problem was traced to inadequate direction finding. After deletions, it is observed that NSA concluded it needed another 105 intercept stations, giving over 2400 hours of coverage.

The solution suggested, which was described as harder to implement than had been realized, was to put the intercept stations in Thailand. Under treaty limitations of the time, the US was not allowed to bring enough personnel into South Vietnam to run the needed intercept positions. BSA looked for a facility, in Thailand, big enough for 800 intercept positions. The Thai government, however, was "skittish".

Increased activity by the Pathet Lao, however, concerned the Thai government, and the US planned, and presented to Thailand, a contingency plan for defending Thailand against Laotian communists. Thailand would have full access to SIGINT affecting its own security.

When the Thai government agreed, however, it caught the US by surprise, and the personnel to establish the facility were not immediately available. Several alternatives were explored, but were rejected because they would take too many resources from combat units. Eventually, an ASA contingent was put together from resources in the Philippines.

Thailand imposed a limit of fifty SIGINT personnel for the site, which eliminated the possibility of adequate direction finding. The compromise was to intercept at the site, but to send the raw data to the Philippines for processing. Thai sensitivities were such that a permanent site was not selected until 1965, when the Udon base was established. Udon would be the only NSA facility in Southeast Asia after the American withdrawal in 1973.

==== The buildup: 1965-1967 ====
After a regiment of PRC MiG-17 fighters arrived at Mengtzu in 1963, SIGINT predicted jet fighters would enter the DRV air defense network. This was reinforced with learning that high-level DRV and PRC personnel would have a meeting at Mengtzu in May 1964.

The Gulf of Tonkin incident, in August 1964, involved two-destroyer DESOTO patrols equipped with intercept vans, backed up with carrier air patrols .

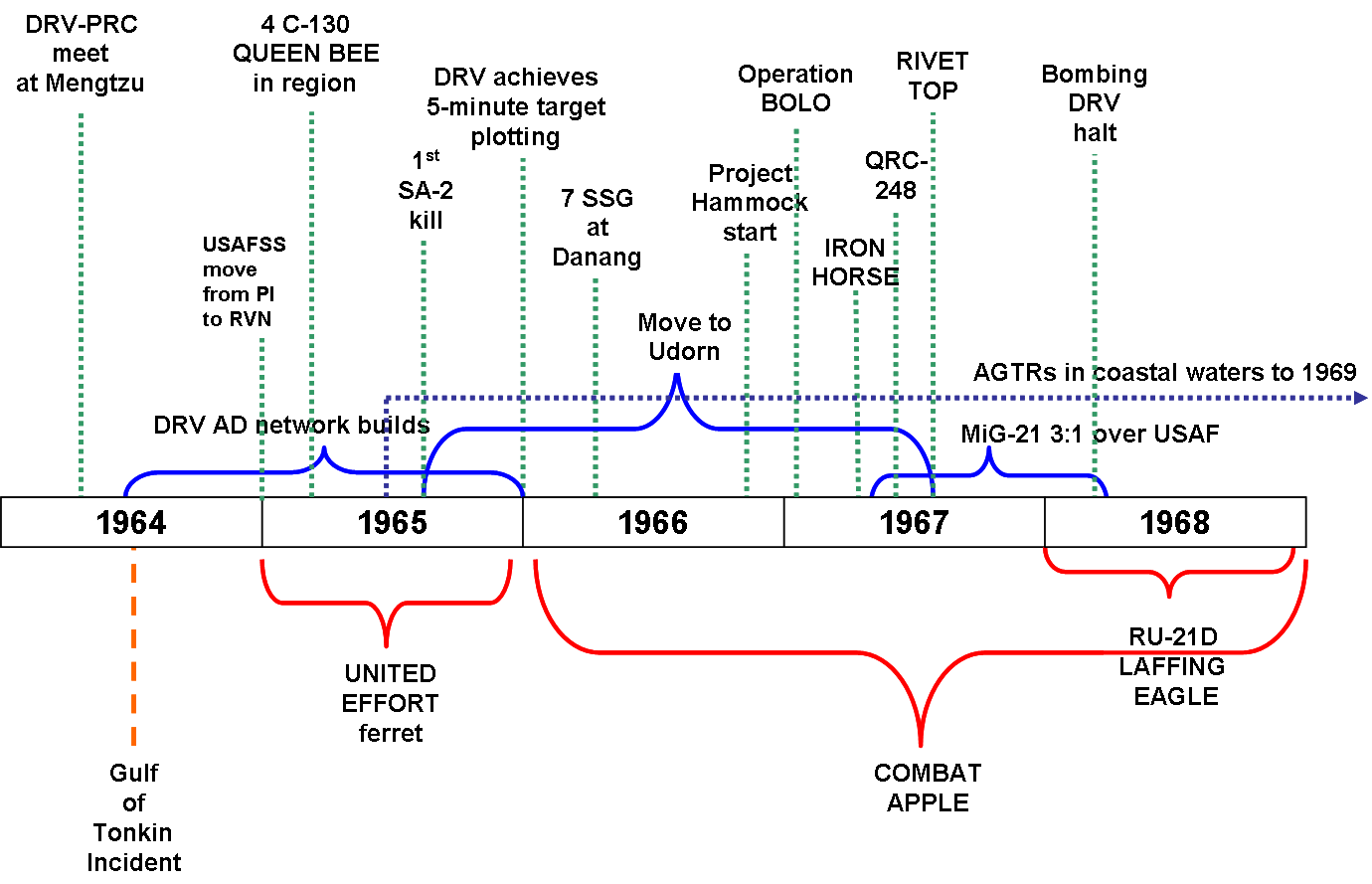
SIGINT-related events, 1964-1968

Early DRV Air Defense Buildup

In the weeks immediately following the Gulf of Tonkin incident, the most important SIGINT role was providing defensive information to US air strikes. This was done at three levels of generality. First, overall monitoring of the DRV air defense network, SIGINT could maintain situational awareness of North Vietnamese tracking via radar and visual observers. Second, SIGINT detected the activation of specific weapons systems in the air defense network, such as SA-2 surface-to-air missiles (SAM), anti-aircraft artillery (AAA), and fighter interceptors. Finally, it could detect immediate threats, such as missile launches or impending attacks by fighters.

Reports from the roughly 40 visual observation stations were sent to sector headquarters, which controlled AAA. These reports were sent by high-frequency (HF) Morse code radiotelegraphy, in standardized message formats where only the specific details needed to be transmitted. It could take up to 30 minutes for a report to work its way through the system, so that more specific tracking or interception orders could be given. According to the NSA history, air defense communications did not change significantly during the war, so COMINT analysts were able to become very familiar with its patterns and usage.

Command and control applied to four system components: air warning from radar and observer stations, limited radar tracking, AAA and SAMs, and fighters. Rapid upgrades started to go into place after the Gulf of Tonkin incident, with the arrival, within two days, of 36 MiG-15 and MiG-17 fighters. These arrived from China and were probably flown, at first, by Chinese pilots, but Vietnamese pilots were soon in familiarization flights.

Two main communications links between the DRV and PRC were established, from Hanoi to Kuangchow and K'unming. These liaison networks allowed access to Chinese radar covering the Gulf of Tonkin, Laos, and Hainan Island, as well as the DRV itself. By 1967-1968, there were approximately 110,000 persons in the DRV air defense system, supporting 150 radars, 150 SAM sites (rarely all active at the same time), and 8,000 AAA pieces. There were 105 fighters, including the MiG-21. At any given time, one-third to one-half of the fighters were based at PRC airfields.

Air Defense headquarters was at Bach Mai Airfield. By January 1966, all major air defense installations, including those in the PRC, were linked by a common HF radio network with standardized procedures. There was an Air Situation Center and an Air Weapons Control Staff. The latter assigned targets to the various defense weapons.

A wider range of communications systems emanated from Air Defense Headquarters, including VHF voice, landlines, and HF/MF. Due to the need to move information quickly, without any automation, most communications were either in low-grade ciphers or were unencrypted.

The DRV system matures, 1965

North Vietnam's air defense system, as of 1965, had three main subsystems:

1. Radar detection and tracking
2. Situational awareness (senior controller at Bac Mai)
3. Tactical fighter direction (Phuc Yen, Gia Lam, Kép)
4. Airborne fighters
5. SAMs and AAA

In 1965, the DRV had full radar coverage, with Chinese input, out to 150 miles (240 km) from its borders. Detection and processing times dropped to five minutes. In contrast, the US did not have full radar coverage over the DRV, and SIGINT was seen as a way of filling the gaps in US knowledge of their air defense operations.

Intensified USAF SIGINT

Under several code names, the last being UNITED EFFORT, the earlier combination of Okinawa-, and then Bien Hoa (Vietnam) based RB-47H ELINT aircraft and drones, originally planned for Cuba, was tried again in 1964, but without the blip-enhancing electronics that would make the North Vietnamese think it was a U-2. The North Vietnamese did not take the bait. Eventually, in 1966, the North Vietnamese shot down a drone, but everything worked and the entire electronic score of the SA-2 symphony was recorded.

Some of the first airborne SIGINT platforms were C-130 QUEEN BEEs, operational by early 1965. They flew two monitoring orbits, one over northwest Thailand and the other over the Gulf of Tonkin. Apparently, there was never a satisfactory basing arrangement for them, although they worked with analysts at Da Nang. Redactions make it impossible to understand their full pattern, but they did, under undefined circumstances, land at Da Nang. Also in early 1965, a large number of US Air Force Security Service (USAFSS) moved from the Philippine Islands (PI) to the Republic of Vietnam.

While the RB-47H's were retired after the 1966 success, the RC-135Ms of the 82nd Strategic Reconnaissance Squadron moved from Japan to Okinawa, in the 4252 Strategic Wing. Tasking increased until those SIGINT platforms were flying daily, then 24-hour coverage under the COMBAT APPLE program, still flying a weekly mission against China or Russia.

COMBAT APPLE missions initially flew over the Gulf of Tonkin, including a refueling station just south of the Demilitarized Zone. The location of the refueling position allowed them to continue collecting SIGINT while drawing fuel from the tanker.

Often just after the COMBAT APPLEs refueled, North Vietnamese MiG-21 fighters would try a single supersonic pass at the COMBAT APPLE aircraft, firing everything and immediately turning back, almost out of fuel. The ungainly RC-135's were heavily loaded and had little ability to maneuver, and no defensive systems. Luckily, none were lost, but carrier-based fighters were soon ordered to escort them. There was a period during which the Navy aircraft fell into a pattern of leaving the RC-135 for their own refueling, and the North Vietnamese tried more attacks when the US fighters flew away. Eventually, better tactics were evolved, including using multiple fighter flights and the RC-135 as bait in what turned out to be an ambush for the MiGs, from a pair of fighters that flew in close formation with the RC-135 and did not show separately on radar.

Obviously, this constant workload stressed the RC-135M's, which periodically had to go back to the US for major maintenance. Attempts were made to fill the vacancy with RC-135D's from Alaska, but aircraft from there, aside from having smaller engines, did not adapt to the tremendously different climate

While ELINT helped against the SAM threat, the first kill of a US aircraft by an SA-2 SAM took place in mid-1965. The DRV air defense network was improving, and, by the end of 1965, were processing tracking reports in 5 minutes, a procedure that previously took 30 minutes.

The classic battle between national-level SIGINT and direct support of operations occurred, and a compromise was reached to put a 7th Air Force SIGINT Support Group at Da Nang. Still, many SIGINT units moved from Vietnam to Udon, Thailand, between 1965 and 1967.

Ship-based SIGINT

Dedicated SIGINT ships, built on merchant hulls, were also used, but proved too vulnerable and slow. An intermediate size, such as Pvt Jose F. Valdez (T-AG-169) operated around Africa from 1961 until 1969. Valdez was too slow to reach the patrol area to which the Liberty was sent. The larger Belmont-class included the USS Liberty (AGTR-5), attacked by Israel in 1967. Modern ship installations generally involve intercept stations in mobile vans, which can be put onto the deck of a warship, which can protect itself as the Pueblo and Liberty could not. Why this level of protection was not available in 1967 is difficult to understand.

Starting in 1965 and continuing until the end of the AGTR program in 1969, two "technical research" SIGINT ships, AGTR-1 Oxford and AGTR-2 Jamestown, sailed up and down the coast of Vietnam, acting as "firemen" to fill gaps in land-based coverage. They also participated in calibrating airborne direction finding.

During this time period, the Medal of Honor was bestowed on the captain of the USS Liberty for his leadership following an Israeli attack on his ship.

A class of even smaller vessels included the Banner-class, including the USS Pueblo (AGER-2), captured by North Korea in 1968.

Second-generation Army tactical SIGINT aircraft (part 1, see 1970s for continuation)

In 1968, the Army introduced the RU-21D LAFFING EAGLE, as an incremental improvement in the long series of RU-21 aircraft, still operational today. The aircraft were technical improvements over their predecessors, but were very maintenance intended. After American forces withdrew from South Vietnam, some RU-21D's went to Thai bases, and all returned to the US in 1975.

== US domestic surveillance ==
Project SHAMROCK and Project MINARET were active through the sixties, and terminated in 1975.

=== SIGINT in support of monitoring French atmospheric nuclear tests ===
After Algerian independence, France moved its nuclear test range to French islands in the Tuamoto Archipelago in the Western Pacific. Typical monitoring scenarios for tests in 1968 and 1970 involved NSA COMINT determining that a French test was imminent. Upon that notice, KC-135R tankers, temporarily modified to carry MASINT sensors, would fly around the test area, as part of Operation BURNING LIGHT.

=== French operations in Africa ===
According to Pike, in the early 1960s, the SDECE, including SIGINT. by the prime minister Michel Debre, and was particularly efficient in the struggle against the rebellion in Algeria. After the disappearance of Mehdi Ben Barka in 1965, de Gaulle made SDECE military again, reporting to the Minister of Defense. He wrote that de Gaulle authorized covert operations, in Quebec, under the rubric of "Assistance et Cooperation Technique" or "Operation Ascot". Pike further states that SDECE, under Foccart, tried, in 1968, to wrest control of Nigerian oil from Britain and the US by arming and supplying secessionists in Nigeria's Biafra region.

== 1970s ==
=== The Vietnam War enters its final phases ===
Elements of the 1st Radio Battalion, USMC, returned to Vietnam in the 1970s, attached to the 9th Marine Amphibious Brigade, operating principally from shipboard platforms. In October 1970 Marine radio units were attached to a US Army unit in Udon Thani, Thailand, but the unit redeployed to Hawaii in 1971.

=== SIGINT and Son Tay ===
Planning of the Son Tay POW rescue, which had begun in June, was well underway before SIGINT personnel were involved. In August, the JCS asked CINCPAC to assign a representative to the project, and the head of SIGINT support to the Pacific Air Defense Analysis Center was picked. Planning was tightly compartmented, with the NSA participation codenamed ADRENALIN. Various other SIGINT flights and the move of the Monkey Mountain Facility had to be changed without revealing the reason. During the raid, however, there was airborne SIGINT support from EC-121 COLLEGE EYE aircraft equipped with the RIVET GYM package for SIGINT and IFF interrogators, as well as COMBAT APPLE RC-135. SIGINT met all expectations, but, of course, did not change the result of the raid.

=== Second-generation Army tactical SIGINT aircraft (continued) ===
LAFFING EAGLE increased RU-21 series capability by adding a second SIGINT operator, receivers with a greater frequency range, and an AN/ASN-86 Internal Navigation System. The new system proved very difficult to maintain, however, requiring constant support from contractor representatives and a 40-foot (12 m) trailer full of test equipment. Later on, the V-SCAN system, which gave 240-degree direction-finding coverage centered around the nose and tail, was added to the RU-21Ds. Those aircraft arrived in Vietnam in December 1968 and heavily used.

WINE BOTTLE and CEFISH PERSON systems, on RU-6A and RU-8D aircraft, were generally unsatisfactory and the 156th Radio Research Company, using these aircraft, redeployed to the US. These aircraft were incapable of true goniometric ARDF, and had to fly over the emitter, dangerously, before pinpointing it.

MASINT sensors to "fingerprint" equipment and operators, first coded SHORT SKIRT and then LEFAIR KNEE, went onto 12 RU-8D airplanes. They were assigned to the 509th Radio Research Group, although some were detached for a time. Some received side-looking airborne radar (SLAR), a MASINT RADINT sensor that later became standard on the OV-1B Mohawk.

LEFT BANK, introduced in 1970, was a first attempt for 360-degree coverage, which was perfected as LEFT JAB on the JU-21A series. LEFT JAB was the first Army system that used an airborne digital computer to combine DF and inertial navigation information. The next refinement, LEFT FOOT, combined the LAFFING EAGLE's sharper DF feature with the LEFT JAB computer, creating the RU-21E aircraft. Very few LEFT FOOT aircraft flew in Vietnam.

CEFIRM LEADER, first known as CRAZY DOG, was an attempt to build a system, called V-SCANARDF, the combined intercept, direction finding, and jamming for the 2-80 MHz frequency range. Implementation involved one of the features to appear in the much later Guardrail series, using several aircraft in a team. RU-21A's carried AN/ARD-22 direction finders. RU-21B's were COMINT intercept aircraft with the AN/ALT-32. RU-21C's carried AN/ALT-29 jammers. Flown by the 1st Army Security Agency Company (Aviation) Ft. Bliss Texas, Cefirm Leader was turned over to the US Army Reserves 138th Aviation Company (EW) Orlando, Florida in 1981. The system was deployed for Operation Royal Duke Ordway Grove, PARPRO missions from NAS Key West, Bright Star 85, and Operation Desert Shield Desert Storm.

=== Air Force strategic SIGINT continues ===
COMBAT APPLE aircraft began to gather SIGINT overland, over the Ho Chi Minh trail and Laos. They went without fighter cover, and in the threat envelope of antiaircraft guns and missiles. When the US detected the antiaircraft weapons, it quickly attacked them, and the North Vietnamese quit trying to shoot down the COMBAT APPLEs.

Several other ELINT versions of the RC-135 flew out of Kadena for specialized ELINT collection, with some aircraft flying missions of 24 hours and more while still based at Offutt AFB, Nebraska, in the US.

Flying from Kadena, the RC-135C model, called the "Chipmunk" after cheek-like antenna pods, were especially effective. They were equipped with an extremely powerful SIGINT system, the AN/ASD-1. This system intercepted, located, and otherwise characterized virtually every signal, recording it all for subsequent analysis. The C models were tasked for worldwide missions, and it only became available for Vietnam on a special mission basis.

Of the Vietnam-era SIGINT aircraft, the RC-135U COMBAT SENT was the most advanced, with only two in the Air Force. Even with its limited availability, it provided important information about North Vietnamese missiles. The COMBAT SENT had extensive ELINT plus a large side-looking radar.

=== Army SIGINT and Vietnamization ===
Until 1973, US SIGINT advisors worked with the South Vietnamese. After the ceasefire, according to the CINCPAC Command History certain US programs continued. The Southeast Asia Airborne Communications Program (ACRP), a program whose plaintext name was classified TOP SECRET, continued. It operated no closer than 50 nautical miles (93 km)s (nmi) to the North Vietnamese coast, except it was not to come with 19 nmi (35 km) of Bac Long Island. Fighter cover for this patrol was discontinued. The ACRP flights had been conducted by a detachment of Navy electronics squadron VQ-1, which relocated from Da Nang, South Vietnam, to Cubi Point Naval Air Station in the Philippines. Discussions among CINCPAC, Navy and Air Force operational commanders, about surveillance of the Gulf of Tonkin were underway, but came to no conclusion in 1973.

Army Airborne Radio Direction Finding (ARDF) in South Vietnam was phased out. RU-8 aircraft left South Vietnam in mid-January. Operations by RU/JU-21 aircraft were reduced, but not eliminated until March 9; they had conducted continuing operations over the northern part of South Vietnam, the DMZ, and the Laotian Panhandle. 22 EC-47 aircraft remained in Thailand, but 10 others remained in Da Nang. The Da Nang force was operated into February by the US, and then turned over to the South Vietnamese.

=== US attempt to improve coordination among the Service Cryptologic Elements ===
A separate SIGINT and communications security organization, or Service Cryptologic Element (SCE), existed for the US Army, Navy, and Air Force. Some of the differences were quite appropriate to support of the military operations of the particular service; the Air Force would be interested ELINT about air defense radars that a bomber might take in attacking the Soviet Union over a polar route, while the Navy would be more interested in coastal air defense radars. The Army would want to be able to recognize hostile artillery fire control radars, and also how to do tactical direction finding, traffic analysis, and field-level cryptanalysis against opposing ground forces.

All of these services also had capabilities to provide national-level intelligence more appropriate for NSA's mission than for support to military operation. The Army had both fixed and mobile intercept equipment appropriate for long-term listening to ground stations, while the Air Force and Navy could probe new foreign electronic systems as part of national-level intelligence goals.

Even though NSA proper had been formed in 1952, the activities of the Service Cryptologic Agencies were not well coordinated. The Air Force and Navy, for example, might duplicate efforts in probing North Korean radars. Air Force RIVET JOINT RC-135 aircraft collected COMINT of interest to all the services. Navy P2 and P3 electronic capabilities also collected data of relevance to the military as a whole.

Bamford described the first effort to organize the SCEs was to create a "fourth branch" of the military, which triggered intense bureaucratic resistance from the services. A compromise was reached by creating the Central Security Service (CSS). The Director of the NSA (DIRNSA) acquired a "second hat" as the commander of CSS. Just as the services rotated the DIRNSA assignment among their three-star (or three-star eligible) intelligence officers, the actual chief of CSS, reporting to DIRNSA, was a two-star post that also rotated among the services. Bamford describes CSS in different ways. At one point, he speaks of "a former senior NSA official who described it as 'a half-assed, last-minute job' designed to destroy the original fourth-service proposal." Later in the same book, however, draws attention, however, to the almost unparalleled power vested in the DIRNSA through NSCID No. 6, revised on 17 February 1972, "All instructions issued by the Director under the authority provided in this paragraph shall be mandatory, subject only to appeal to the Secretary of Defense." Thus, the DIRNSA is able to bypass "not only the Joint Chiefs, but even the secretaries of the branches" giving him his own SIGINT Army, Navy, Air Force, and Marines.

The idea of a fourth service branch for SIGINT is not unheard of; "NSA's Canadian cousin, the Communications Security Establishment (CSE) relies entirely upon the Canadian Forces Supplementary Radio System (CFSRS) for all raw SIGINT collection. CFSRS has been a part of the Canadian Forces Information Operations Group (CFIOG) since the latter was established 08 May 1998." Clive uses the example of the Navy SCE, as of 2002, as showing the significance of organizations under CSS control: "the Naval Security Group (NSG) might be the best indicator of the significance of the military contribution to NSA's SIGINT efforts. According to Steven Aftergood of the Federation of American Scientists (FAS), the NSG is responsible for "Signals Security matters and, for Data Link Vulnerability Assessment Methodology within the Navy Vulnerability Assessment Program." The Naval Security Group Command (NSGC) "coordinates with, tasks as appropriate, and appraises the efforts of commands and offices of the Department of the Navy and NSA/Central Security Service in the fulfillment of Navy logistics support requirements, as directed by the Secretary of Defense. It also participates in NSA studies as required." The cryptologic staff "work with some of the most sophisticated and complex systems the Navy has to offer in performance of their mission." NSGC's Commander "reports to the Chief, Central Security Service (CSS) as the Navy Element Commander of the CSS and performs cryptologic functions at the National level as the Commander of the Navy's Service Cryptologic Element (SCE)." Considering just NSG's structure, naval SIGINT, and by inference all military SIGINT, does not appear to be a mainly nominal entity. Certainly, with the information overload that the Internet has brought, even for NSA, they can use all the help they can get."

=== US domestic surveillance by NSA ===
A Senate Select Committee, generally called the Church Committee, began some of the first public hearings on US intelligence. These hearings revealed information that was questionably legal, and led to the termination of some programs, such as COINTELPRO, Project SHAMROCK, and Project MINARET, as well as enacting, in 1978, the Foreign Intelligence Surveillance Act (FISA). FISA established guidelines for COMINT involving US citizens, and established a special FISA Court to approve warrants. The FISA judges were cleared for all intelligence information relevant to warrant requests.

During these hearings, the Director of NSA, LTG Lew Allen, discussed targeting of information, including the names of American citizens, in watch lists: "The use of lists of words, including individual names, subjects, locations, et cetera, has long been one of the methods used to sort out information of foreign intelligence value from that which is not of interest. In the past such lists have been referred to occasionally as watch lists, because the lists were used as an aid to watch for foreign activity of reportable intelligence interest. However, these lists generally did not contain names of U.S. citizens or organizations. The activity in question is one in which U.S. names were used systematically as a basis for selecting messages, including some between U.S. citizens, when one of the communicants was at a foreign location."

Richard M. Nixon ordered the CIA to gather information on foreign sources of controlled substances and how they entered the US. As part of this initiative, the Bureau of Narcotics and Dangerous Drugs (BNDD) requested NSA COMINT related to foreign drug traffic, including watch lists with some U.S. names. International drug trafficking became a formal US Intelligence Board (USIB) requirement in 1971. Other target names for watch lists, concerned with North Vietnam, came from the Defense Intelligence Agency.

During the hearings, LTG Allen said he had received a letter, on October 1, 1973, from Attorney General Elliot Richardson "indicating that he was concerned with respect to the propriety of requests for information concerning U.S. citizens which NSA had received from the FBI and Secret Service. He wrote the following:

"Until I am able more carefully to assess the effect of Keith and other Supreme Court decisions concerning electronic surveillance upon your current practice of disseminating to the FBI and Secret Service information acquired by you through electronic devices pursuant to requests from the FBI and Secret Service, it is requested that you immediately curtail the further dissemination of such information to these agencies."

=== Strategic SIGINT satellites for NSA ===
From 1972 to 1989, low earth orbit SIGINT satellites were launched only as secondary payloads with KH-9 and KH-11 IMINT satellites. They were code-named after female sex symbols, such as RAQUEL, FARRAH, BRIDGET and MARILYN.

Four geosynchronous RHYOLITE satellites were launched in the seventies, with COMINT and TELINT missions. These were reported to be directed against line-of-sight microwave, telemetry, or both. Their signals downlinked to Pine Gap station in Alice Springs, Australia. According to Encyclopedia Astronautica, the downlink was in a remote location, to prevent Soviet or Chinese SIGINT personnel from intercepting the downlink, and, in turn, discovering the targeting of the satellites. Downlinked data was then encrypted and retransmitted to NSA at Fort Meade, Maryland.

The project became unusually public as it was the key element in the espionage trial of the 'Falcon and the Snowman', Boyce and Lee. Rhyolite was also known as Program 720, Program 472, and Aquacade. After having the name compromised when Christopher Boyce sold information to the Soviets, the code name was changed to AQUACADE. In the late seventies, another class of geosynchronous SIGINT satellites, first called CHALET and renamed VORTEX after the code name was compromised. After the loss of Iranian monitoring stations, these satellites were also given a TELINT capability.

JUMPSEAT ELINT satellites, using a Molniya orbit, started launching in 1975. Their launch parameters were very similar to the SDS communications satellites used for connectivity in high latitudes, and individual launches could easily have been either JUMPSEAT or SDS. While the primary mission of JUMPSEAT constellations appeared to be microwave COMINT, they may also have had ELINT capabilities.

== 1980s ==
This was a decade of world change, with changes in Cold War alliances and emphasis, the first submarine attack since World War II in the context of a regional war involving extensive power projection, low- and medium-intensity operations, and continuing national policy development.

=== 1980s Cold War SIGINT ===
Roughly from the late 1980s on, there was cooperation between the US and the PRC in collecting SIGINT of mutual interest, principally against the Soviet Union. It is believed that the Qitai and Korla sites, in Xinjiang (Sinkiang) are operated jointly by the Chinese and the US CIA Office of SIGINT Operations against Soviet missile tests and space launches, but their current status is uncertain.

Spruance-class destroyers sailed on collection missions in the Black Sea, Baltic Sea, and off the coast of Libya, a Soviet client.

Boeing RC-135 "Rivet Joint" aircraft carried out signals intelligence missions under the nickname "Burning Wind." They flew from bases including Offutt AFB, Nebraska, where the 55th Strategic Reconnaissance Wing was homebased; Eielson AFB, Alaska; Howard AB, Panama; Hellenikon Air Base, Greece; Kadena Air Base, Okinawa, Japan; and RAF Mildenhall, Suffolk, and RAF Upper Heyford, Oxfordshire, in the United Kingdom.

=== 1980s Middle East SIGINT ===
AFter extensive negotiations, the Multinational Force in Lebanon was deployed to Beirut in 1983. It consisted of separate U.S.; French; and British contingents. The 1st Battalion, 8th Marines, lost 241 men in the 1983 Beirut barracks bombings that also killed 58 French paratroopers of 3rd Company of the 6th Parachute Infantry Regiment.

SIGINT teams were attached to the Marine force there. Unfortunately, SIGINT had little role to play in the force protection problem.

Western hostages were a major concern to the US and UK. The US approach was the Iran-Contra Affair arms-for-hostages swap. Urban wrote SIS learned about the plan, although the UK had not been officially told about it. The British did not discuss their information, learned from a HUMINT source, with the US, according to one British officer "All we could do was tuck it away in a box, we couldn't have discussed it with them. This was UK Eyes Alpha, after all!" Britain may later have gotten information from the US, which, according to Andy McNab. had prepared a rescue mission by the Special Air Service. Troops deployed to the Middle East, including a team in Beirut, but the mission was called off.

=== 1980s Falklands War SIGINT ===
During the Falklands War (Spanish: Guerra de las Malvinas/Guerra del Atlántico Sur) in 1982, Argentina used Boeing 707s, with visual reconnaissance capability only, to surveillance of the British Task Force. These were driven away by British Harriers and missiles, at which point their use was stopped. The experience, however, convinced Argentina that it needed a SIGINT aircraft, and Israel later converted an Argentine 707.

Under the UKUSA Agreement, Great Britain called upon NSA SIGINT satellite resources to collect relevant information. Tension existed because the controversial British investigative journalist, Duncan Campbell, had published information considered sensitive. According to one former British SIGINT officer, "We can ask the Americans to do things, but we cannot compel them. There may be targets they don't want to cover. The Falklands was a factor here. It brought going it alone back into fashion."

=== Policy and doctrinal evolution ===
Aside from public multinational activities such as the abortive 1983 Beirut barracks bombing, there were less obvious discussion and negotiation among nations seeking to deal with the immense cost of space-based SIGINT.

==== 1980s French SIGINT policy ====
Pike wrote that the Socialist government, elected in May 1981 and led President François Mitterrand were unknown at the time of his election in May 1981 marked the attempt to put SDECE under civilian control. In June 1981, Pierre Marion, a civilian who was the former Director of the Paris Airport, was named to the head of the SDECE but met with opposition, as a socialist and civilian, from inside SDECE.

France and Britain had both been facing both the desirability and cost of intelligence satellites independent of the US. In the mid-1980s, with the development of the Ariane launcher and its associated large launch complex in French Guiana, the French liked the idea of such independence. Planning started on French IMINT satellites called Helios, a radar imaging satellite called Osiris and then Horus, and a SIGINT satellite to be called Zenon when operational. France would launch technology demonstrators before a fully operational SIGINT satellite.

==== 1980s United Kingdom SIGINT policy ====
To obtain some autonomy in SIGINT, while simultaneously strengthening its role in the UKUSA Agreement, Britain planned to launch its own SIGINT satellite, codenamed Zircon. Proposed in 1983 to be in a geosynchronous orbit over the Soviet Union, it was cancelled, principally on grounds of cost, in 1987. Urban stated that Britain did contribute to the cost of one of the NSA MAGNUM SIGINT satellites, possibly having one dedicated to UK use.

After the decision not to develop the independent ZIRCON, the possibility of cooperating with France on space-based intelligence was considered by the Cabinet, along with other discussions with France about co-developing an air-launched nuclear missile. While France might have welcomed the investment, the cost still would be very high for Britain, and the traditional antagonism between France and the UK would have to have been overcome.

According to Urban, by 1987, the UK concluded working with the French was not a real alternative. Perhaps based on experience with the UKUSA Agreement, a British civil servant observed, "Investing anywhere else [than the US] would have bought far less capability. The French don't even know how far behind they are."

==== 1980s United States strategic SIGINT policy and doctrinal evolution ====
In 1980, U.S. intercepts of Soviet communications generated a fear that the Soviets were about to invade Iran. In 1983 intercepts allowed the United States to piece together the details concerning the sinking of a Soviet submarine in the North Pacific.

In 1983 it began an all-source program targeting Soviet prison camp system, with the specific intent of issuing a study that would embarrass the Soviets.

MAGNUM geosynchronous SIGINT satellites were first launched from the Space Shuttle in 1985. These were believed to be more sensitive and perhaps stealthier than RHYOLITE/AQUACADE.

After the Liberty and Pueblo incidents, only combatant ships, destroyers and frigates, were used for collection missions. In addition to SIGINT intercept against the Soviets, combatant ships operated off Nicaragua, El Salvador, and Honduras. One purpose-built SIGINT auxiliary, the ARL-24 Sphinx, generally stayed off the Nicaraguan coast.

== See also ==
- Signals intelligence in modern history
- Consolidated PB4Y-2 Privateer
