= Project MINARET =

National Security Agency surveillance operation

Project MINARET was a domestic espionage project operated by the National Security Agency (NSA) between 1967 and 1973, which, after intercepting electronic communications that contained the names of predesignated US citizens, passed them to other government law enforcement and intelligence organizations. Intercepted messages were disseminated to the FBI, CIA, Secret Service, Bureau of Narcotics and Dangerous Drugs (BNDD), and the Department of Defense. The project was a sister project to Project SHAMROCK.

Over 5,925 foreigners and 1,690 organizations and US citizens were included on the Project MINARET watch lists. 1,650 U.S. citizens were targeted. Among those monitored were: U.S. Senator Howard Baker, Civil Rights Movement leaders Martin Luther King Jr. and Whitney Young, boxer Muhammad Ali, New York Times journalist Tom Wicker, the actress Jane Fonda and Washington Post humor columnist Art Buchwald.

== History ==
Starting in 1962, the NSA had a "watch list" of Americans travelling to Cuba, expanded to include narcotic traffickers. Then, from 1967 onwards, President Lyndon B. Johnson included the names of activists in the anti-war movement. President Richard Nixon further expanded the list to include civil rights leaders, journalists and two senators. The NSA included David Kahn.

The names were on "watch lists" of American citizens, generated by Executive Branch law enforcement and intelligence agencies, to detect communications involving the listed individuals. There was no judicial oversight, and the project had no warrants for interception. The NSA cooperated with FBI and CIA requests for international communications of targeted individuals as long as the recipients distanced the NSA from involvement. This entailed the FBI and CIA either returning the reports to the NSA or destroying them after two weeks, classifying the reports "Top Secret," and not filing them along with other NSA records.

The 1972 Keith decision by the U.S. Supreme Court became a controversial issue mainly because, even though the court had confirmed that the government had the authority to protect the nation from subversive activity, it ruled against the government's ability to use warrantless electronic surveillance for domestic espionage purposes. This controversy became a major case against Project MINARET.

Operating between 1967 and 1973, over 5,925 foreigners and 1,690 organizations and US citizens were included on the Project MINARET watch lists. NSA Director, Lew Allen, testified before the Senate Intelligence Committee in 1975 that the NSA had issued over 3,900 reports on the watch-listed Americans.

According to Stephen Budiansky, a 1977 Dept. of Justice review concluded wiretap laws were violated, but "If the intelligence agencies possessed too much discretionary authority with too little accountability, that would seem to be a 35-year failing of Presidents and the Congress rather than the agencies or their personnel."

One result of these investigations was the 1978 creation of the Foreign Intelligence Surveillance Act (FISA), which limited the powers of the NSA and put in place a process of warrants and judicial review. Another internal safeguard was U.S. Signal Intelligence Directive 18, an internal NSA and intelligence community set of procedures, originally issued in 1980, and updated in 1993. USSID 18 was the general guideline for handling signals intelligence (SIGINT) inadvertently collected on US citizens, without a warrant, prior to the George W. Bush Administration. Interpretations of FISA and the principles of USSID 18 by the Bush administration assume the Executive Branch has unitary authority for warrantless surveillance, which is under Congressional investigation as an apparent violation of the intent of FISA.

== Domestic targets ==
1,650 U.S. citizens were targeted. Among those monitored were: U.S. Senator Howard Baker, Civil Rights Movement leaders Martin Luther King Jr. and Whitney Young, boxer Muhammad Ali, New York Times journalist Tom Wicker, the actress Jane Fonda and Washington Post humor columnist Art Buchwald.

In 1975, Senator Frank Church, himself a target, chaired the Church Committee, which disclosed the program.

== Role of Britain's GCHQ agency ==
Britain's intelligence agency Government Communications Headquarters (GCHQ) took part in the program, targeting several anti-Vietnam War dissidents such as Tom Hayden and Jane Fonda. The GCHQ handed over intercepted data of Americans to the U.S. government.

== See also ==
- ECHELON, Stellar Wind, Trailblazer, Thinthread, Turbulence, SHAMROCK, DCSNet
- Main Core
- COINTELPRO
- FBI Index
- Warrantless searches in the United States
