= 313th Military Intelligence Battalion =

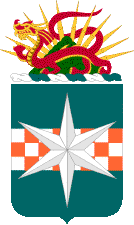
- 313th Military Intelligence Battalion Coat of Arms
- Active: 1942 - 1945; 1955 - 1957; 1962 - 2006
- Disbanded: 2006; 20 years ago
- Country: United States
- Branch: United States Army
- Type: Airborne Military Intelligence
- Role: Aerial Reconnaissance; Collection Management; Communications; Counterintelligence; Electronic Attack; Human Intelligence; Imagery Intelligence; Intelligence Analysis; Long-Range Surveillance; Remote Battlefield Surveillance; Signals Intelligence; System Maintenance & Integration
- Size: Battalion
- Part of: 82nd Airborne Division
- Garrison/HQ: Fort Bragg
- Nicknames: Crimson Dragons (Official); Snow Owls; The most decorated MI Battalion in the Army
- Patron: Saint Michael
- Mottos: Savoir c'est Pouvoir; (Knowledge is Power)
- Colors: Teal Blue; Orange
- Engagements: World War II; Operation Power Pack; Vietnam; Operation Urgent Fury; Operation Golden Pheasant; Operation Just Cause; Operation Desert Shield; Operation Desert Storm; Operation Joint Guardian; Operation Enduring Freedom; Operation Iraqi Freedom

Insignia
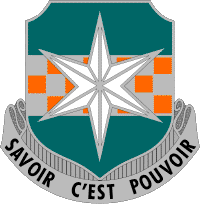
- Distinctive Unit Insignia

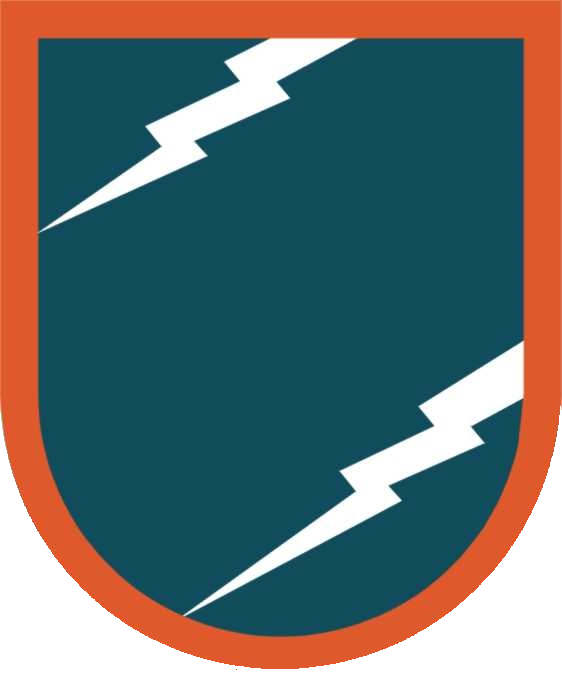
- Beret Flash

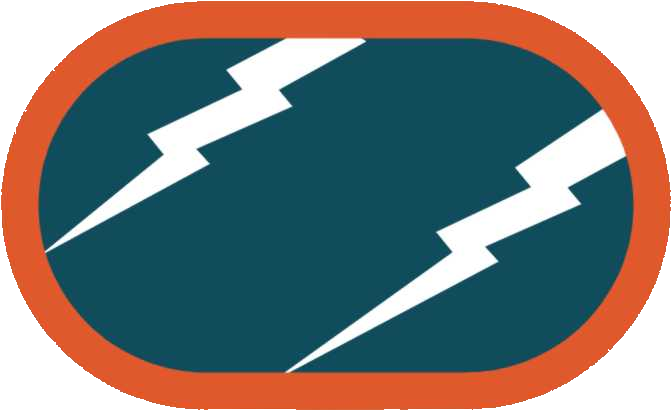
- Background Trimming

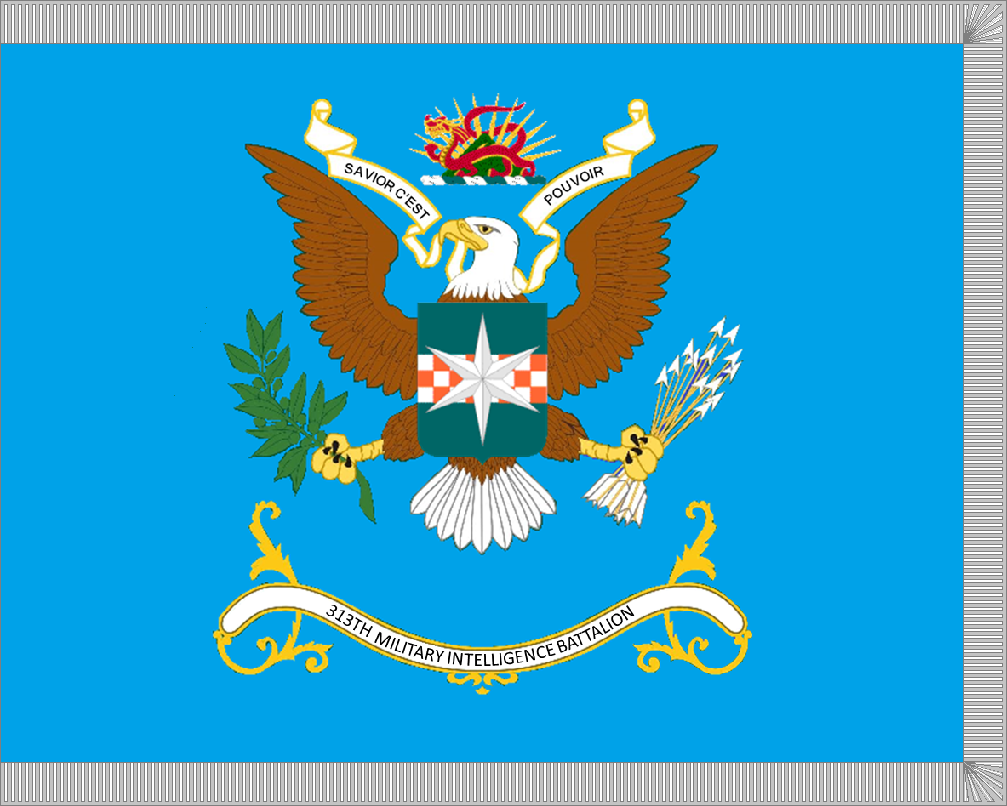
- Organizational Colors

The 313th Military Intelligence Battalion was an active duty Airborne Military Intelligence Battalion of the United States Army.

== Unit history ==
=== Background ===
Before World War II, the United States Intelligence Community was fragmented and ad hoc, comprising numerous government and military entities who were reluctant to share information with each other. President Roosevelt directed the Joint Board to form the Office of the Coordinator of Information (COI) in mid-1941 and the attack on Pearl Harbor later that year prompted the War Department to expand the Army's existing entities into the Military Intelligence Service, the Counterintelligence Corps, and the Signal Security Agency. The Joint board also formed Office of Strategic Services from elements of the COI as America entered World War II.

During the first decades of the Cold War, Army intelligence departments maintained compartmentalization by discipline for security purposes. Their missions and assignments were classified, organizations utilized deception, while personnel operated in and out of cover to protect their missions first and themselves second. Seemingly divergent organizations like the Army Security Agency, the Army Intelligence Agency, and numerous intelligence production units would eventually merge forming the Intelligence and Security Command. During the decades leading up to the formation of the modern Military Intelligence Corps, these agencies and their personnel were laying the groundwork for what would become "The Army's Most Decorated MI Battalion."

=== World War II ===
==== 215th Signal Depot Company ====
The lineage of the 313th Military Intelligence Battalion is traced to the 215th Signal Depot Company, which was activated on 25 September 1942 at Camp Livingston, Louisiana. The 215th, composed of approximately 190 personnel, arrived in Liverpool, England in October 1943 and moved en masse by train to Taunton, Somerset. From there, the unit detached to perform various support activities, mostly repairing, maintaining, and issuing communications equipment to field units marshaled there.

In April 1944, the 215th was attached to First Army and moved to Hindon, Wiltshire in southern England anticipating the invasion of mainland Europe. The unit planned and made laborious efforts to prepare for amphibious operations before sending three detachments to the southwestern English port towns of Paignton, Pencalenick, and Swanage in mid-May.

===== Normandy =====
These detachments participated in the Normandy landings with the advance element landing on Utah Beach at 1030 hours on 6 June. 215th personnel were under sporadic fire from German artillery, aircraft, and even occasional sniper's bullet well into that first night as front-line units moved inland. One detachment, which landed at approximately 2200 hours, even captured two German prisoners.

While awaiting deliveries of communications equipment to perform their assigned mission, detachments assisted other units in establishing communications networks along the beach. Another detachment of the 215th salvaged a radar set from a sunken landing craft; drying, repairing, then reissuing it as an operational set. These radars were instrumental with ensuring air defense units were ready for enemy aircraft approaching the beach, protecting follow-on forces as they continued landing.

The third detachment landed on D+1, helping to establish a depot near Sainte-Marie-du-Mont on the road to Cherbourg Naval Base from the Normandy beaches in support of VII Corps units. Because of the proximity to Sainte-Mère-Église and Carentan, the American airborne forces' objectives, paratroopers from the 82nd and 101st Airborne Divisions were supported from this depot, replenishing their communications equipment which was lost or battle-damaged during their combat parachute assault into Normandy.

On D+2 one detachment established a signal supply depot in vicinity of Colleville issuing equipment "without formal requisitions in view of the tactical situation" before moving with an estimated 5,000 tons of equipment 12 miles (19 km) on D+6 to establish a depot near Mosles. Here, the depot was engaged nightly at approximately 2300 hours by a lone German aircraft dubbed "Bed Check Charlie" who dropped flares and the occasional bomb with no damage to personnel, equipment, or supplies reported. On 6 August this depot moved to Torigni-sur-Vire where it remained until consolidating in Belgium in late-September.

===== Northern France =====
The headquarters section and remainder of the 215th arrived in Saint-Laurent-sur-Mer on 15 June, assisting in the consolidation of depots near Bricqueville while her detachments augmented various units as allied forces seized Cherbourg. Some detachments relocated in order to support elements maneuvering to take Caen which was liberated in early-August. This opened the way for Patton's Third Army to advance 60 miles (97 km) in just two weeks from Avranches to Argentan, aided by Ultra intelligence which apprised him of German counterattacks, indicating where to concentrate his forces. The 215th moved along with 5,000 tons of equipment and supplies to Saint-Samson-de-Bonfossé in early August to support Patton's thrust.

As the allies raced through France toward Germany, the disparate 215th elements maneuvered behind the advance, occupying numerous depots throughout France eventually reaching Belgium, securing a warehouse in Verviers where the 215th consolidated for the first time since D-Day on 30 September. Equipment was stockpiled in anticipation of impending military operations and while front lines stabilized, friendly units refitted by sending their equipment to the 215th for repair or replacement. The work load was so great that the 215th was augmented by an additional signal repair company and three ordnance heavy automotive maintenance companies.

===== Battle of the Bulge =====
After the onset of winter in late-1944, the 215th continued maintenance activities in support of front-line units. As inclement weather slowed the Allied tempo, the Germans initiated a counter-attack on 16 December which would later become known as the Battle of the Bulge. The 215th at Verviers was approximately 15 miles (24 km) from the Germans on the Siegfried Line and were unaffected by the initial German artillery bombardment, the first phase of their counter-attack. In the early hours of 17 December, German paratroopers parachuted into the Allies' rear area intending to seize the crossroads at Jalhay, just 5 miles (8.0 km) from Verviers. Mis-drops of the paratroopers (some as far as 50 miles (80 km) off-target) confused the Allies into believing the Germans conducted a division-level airborne operation, and the 215th was told that 500 Nazi paratroopers had seized the road between Eupen and Malmedy, within 10 miles (16 km) of their location. In response, the company activated and drilled their base defense plan as several alerts were implemented over the coming days.

As the Germans approached Verviers, they shelled supply routes around the town. The commander of First Army ordered the evacuation of the depot to preserve its stocks and capability. Over 5,000 tons of equipment was loaded onto 400 rail cars and evacuated a reported 90 miles (140 km) southwest to Charleroi. By 21 December the unit had resumed their mission, repairing equipment damaged by the German offensive while also installing communications equipment onto nearly 300 M4 Sherman tanks; a task made even more difficult by inadequate facilities, the biting winds, and the cold steel of the tanks. These tanks were largely responsible for repelling the German attack.

===== Central Europe =====
Following the Battle of the Bulge, the 215th again detached from Verviers to support the Allies crossing the Rhine, integrating into numerous depots through Belgium then onward into Germany. The headquarters eventually occupied a depot near Jena in central Germany by 1 May before the war in Europe came to a close. The unit returned stateside and was inactivated in November 1945 at Camp Kilmer, New Jersey. The 215th commander encapsulated the spirit of his unit by reporting: "Satisfaction enough, however, for both officers and enlisted men, is in knowing that a piece of Signal equipment repaired by them will not fail the man with the rifle."

==== 82nd Counterintelligence Corps Detachment ====
The provisional Counterintelligence Corps (CIC) attached personnel to the 82nd Airborne Division who accompanied the division into combat on all major operations from Sicily to Germany; conducting interrogations of captured enemy personnel and performing counterintelligence activities in occupied areas. Human Intelligence attachments included what would later become the 82nd CIC Detachment, four Interrogator Prisoner of War teams, and a Military Intelligence Interpreter team.

Before dawn on D-Day, the CIC personnel attached to the American airborne forces parachuted or landed by glider into Normandy. The initial D-Day mission of CIC troops was to locate, seize, and control all important communications centers and take charge of civilian traffic. Some CIC detachments contacted resistance groups to facilitate their mission, but no specific mention of the 82nd doing so was found. Additionally, of the eight agents who parachuted in with the 101st Airborne, three were killed in action and two were wounded and captured, showing the inherent perils the airborne faced that day; though there were no reports of significant casualties amongst the CIC personnel accompanying the 82nd.

On 12 July 1944, a month after landing on Normandy, the 82nd Counter Intelligence Corps Detachment was formally constituted by the United States Army, after having already accompanied the 82nd into combat for the better part of a year. Constitute in this context merely means to place the designation of the new unit on the official rolls of the Army, and the unit was formally activated the next month in England on 20 August 1944, no doubt while the unit prepared for the impending airborne assault into Holland.

Records are spotty regarding the 82nd CIC Detachment, likely due to the sensitive nature of their work, but based on their official military honors, they went on to participate in Operation Market Garden, the Battle of the Bulge, and the final push into Germany across the Ruhr River then finishing in Ludwigslust after crossing the Elbe.

==== 3191st Signal Service Company ====
Four days after D-Day, the 3191st Signal Service Company was constituted before being officially activated on 20 June 1944 at Camp Crowder, Missouri, the home of the Central Signal Corps Replacement Training Center.

The unit likely consisted of a cadre of some seasoned, along with newly appointed, Officers and Non-Commissioned Officers leading soldiers who recently completed their initial training at Camp Crowder.

As with the 82nd CIC Detachment, little information is available about the 3191st, likely due to the sensitive nature of their work. What is available indicates that the company moved to Fort Monmouth, New Jersey sometime after activation, ostensibly to deploy to the European theater if needed. Based on their unit awards, the 3191st was not needed in Europe and instead deployed to the Asiatic-Pacific Theater taking part in the liberation of the Philippines in the Battle of Luzon. The unit was deactivated in the Philippines on 25 October 1945, two months after Japan accepted the terms of the Potsdam Declaration.

=== Post-World War II/Early Cold War ===
==== 215th Signal Depot Company ====
In 1955 the 215th was reactivated, converted and redesignated the 313th Communications Research Battalion, absorbing the 358th Communications Research Company (see 3191st Signal Service Company below) as A Company and the 337th Communications Research Company as B Company; the 337th was first activated in 1952. On July 1, 1956, the 313th was redesignated as an Army Security Agency (ASA) Battalion, and the subordinate companies designated as ASA Companies. Ultimately, the battalion would be deactivated December 15, 1957 at Fort Bragg, North Carolina, as part of a reorganization by the ASA.

==== 82nd Counterintelligence Corps Detachment ====
The detachment returned to Fort Bragg with the 82nd after occupation duty and was allotted to the Regular Army shortly after the division itself was saved from deactivation and allotted to the Regular Army. The CIC Detachment was further redesignated as the 82nd Military Intelligence Detachment in 1958.

==== 3191st Signal Service Company ====
As cold war tensions rose and the Americans bolstered their intelligence apparatus, the Army reactivated the 3191st Signal Service Detachment in mid-1951 at Fort Devens, redesignating the unit the 358th Communications Reconnaissance Company. The 358th would fall under the 313th (as A Company) in 1955 before being deactivated again in late-1957.

=== Vietnam ===
==== 313th Army Security Agency Battalion ====
The 313th was activated again on May 25, 1962, at Fort Bragg, with A Company and B Company maintaining their previous lineages of the 358th and 337th Communication Reconnaissance Companies. The battalion was reactivated in anticipation of the structured implementation of ASA OPLAN 7-61 (codenamed WHITEBIRCH), designed to "increase U.S. COMINT/DF capability against guerrilla communications of Communist forces in South Vietnam, North Vietnam and Laos."

When the 313th was slotted to deploy to Vietnam in 1966, the ASA removed its organic companies with A Company redesignated the 358th (supporting the 82nd Airborne Division), B Company reflagged as the 337th ASA Company (supporting the 1st Infantry Division), and C Company becoming the 10th Radio Research Unit (supporting the 1st Cavalry Division) and later, the 371st ASA. The reason for the reorganization was the impending deployment of numerous ASA Direct Support Units (DSUs) as the war in Vietnam escalated. A DSU was an ASA company supporting an army division; the company would further organize detachments to support the brigades or regiments of that division and independent brigades were allotted their own ASA detachments. Once in-country, the 313th's anticipated mission would be to oversee DSU activities; while there were four DSUs operating in Vietnam in 1965, by 1968 the number exploded to sixteen.

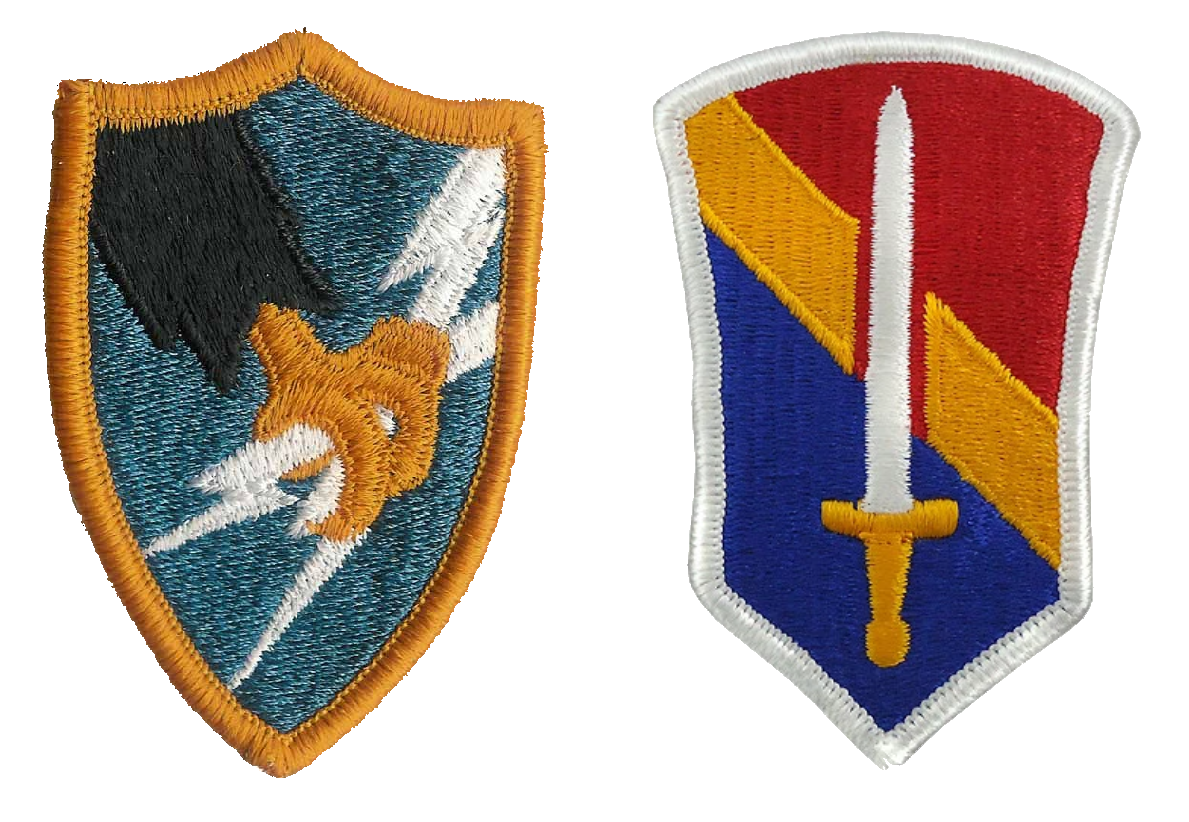
Shoulder Sleeve Insignia of the Army Security Agency (left) and the I Field Force, Vietnam (right)

In February 1966, with only about 60 percent of its authorized strength, the 313th ASA Battalion deployed to Nha Trang using the cover name 13th Radio Research Unit, and was assigned to the 509th Radio Research Group. Charged with supporting I Field Force (FFV-I), the battalion oversaw DSUs deployed in the II Corps Tactical Zone (AKA Military Region 2). All collection, processing, and reporting efforts from the DSUs and stations in II Corps were coordinated through the 313th, making them responsible for monitoring all communist communications in the Central Highlands from Quảng Nam Province south to Đắk Lắk Province (AKA Dar Lac or Darlac). The 313th also concentrated on FFV I headquarters telephone switchboards and radio circuits, ostensibly seeking to ferret out hostile agents amongst the local employees and partner force personnel working at FFV-I.

The battalion would see her previous companies again in-country, with operational control over the 371st (formerly C Company; as the 10th Radio Research Unit) supporting the 1st Cavalry Division. Also, the 358th (formerly A Company) deployed for a short time with the 3rd Brigade of the 82nd Airborne Division in response to the Tet Offensive of 1968, before returning stateside to support the 82nd's global contingency mission. Additionally, the 337th (formerly B Company) deployed in support of the 1st Infantry Division in the I Corps Tactical Zone (AKA Military Region 1), falling under control the 303rd ASA Battalion.

Personnel would be reassigned and some would return, but the 313th would stay in-country until July 1971, earning five Meritorious Unit Commendations, the Republic of Vietnam Cross of Gallantry with Palm, and 12 campaign streamers.

==== 82nd Military Intelligence Detachment ====
Along with the 358th ASA Company, the 3rd Brigade of the 82nd Airborne Division was supported in-country by the 82nd MI Detachment, who earned the Republic of Vietnam Civil Action Honor Medal. After redeploying to Fort Bragg with the brigade in late-1969, the detachment became the 82nd Military Intelligence Company in November 1970.

=== Formation ===
The Headquarters of the 313th ASA Battalion was reorganized as the 313th Military Intelligence Battalion and assigned to the 82nd Airborne Division on 16 October 1979. Simultaneously, the 358th ASA Company was restructured and designated A Company while the 82nd Military Intelligence Company reorganized and became B Company.

On 1 November 1988, Companies A, B, and C were designated as direct support companies for each of the three infantry brigades while Company D was activated, assuming roles as the general support company for the division. The battalion continued to evolve in the 1990s, with the reassignment of the Long Range Surveillance Detachment from the 1st Squadron, 17th Cavalry Regiment, the division's cavalry squadron, to the 313th Military Intelligence Battalion.

The unit provided direct and general support to the 82d Airborne Division in the form of intelligence collection, analysis, and dissemination; counterintelligence and interrogation; signals intelligence, including ground and air based intercept, jamming, and direction finding; remote battlefield sensors and ground surveillance radar; moving target indicators; and long range surveillance.

The unit's lineage included 23 campaign and battle streamers from World War II, the Dominican Republic, Vietnam, Grenada, Panama, and the Persian Gulf. The battalion earned seven Meritorious Unit Commendations, one Army Superior Unit Award, and five foreign unit awards.

The 313th Military Intelligence Battalion was also one of the most diverse units in the United States Army, with soldiers holding 47 different military occupational specialties and speaking eight different languages.

In 2006 the battalion was inactivated when, as part of the Army-wide reorganization of combat forces to the modular structure, it was broken up and most of its personnel and equipment were reassigned to the brigade support battalions in each of the division's brigade combat teams. The battalion's long range surveillance detachment was reorganized, reflagged and reassigned as Company F (Pathfinder), 2nd Battalion, 82d Aviation Regiment, Combat Aviation Brigade, 82nd Airborne Division.

=== Battalion Monument ===
Former members of the battalion organized for a monument to be placed along the entranceway to the Airborne & Special Operations Museum in Fayetteville, North Carolina, adjacent to Fort Bragg. The monument was formally dedicated on 9 September 2017 and features engravings of the Master Parachutist Badge, the Military Intelligence Corps' Branch Insignia, and the 313th's Distinctive Unit Insignia. A list of the battalion's soldiers who were killed in action and in training accidents, unit coins, and other unit artifacts were placed under the stone.

== Honors ==
=== Campaign Streamers ===
World War II	Vietnam	Armed Forces Expeditions	Southwest Asia
Normandy (with arrowhead)	Counteroffensive	Dominican Republic	Defense of Saudi Arabia
Northern France	Counteroffensive, Phase II	Grenada	Liberation and Defense of Kuwait
Rhineland	Counteroffensive, Phase III	Company A additionally entitled to:	Cease-Fire
Ardennes-Alsace	Tet Counteroffensive	Panama (with arrowhead)
Central Europe	Counteroffensive, Phase IV
Normandy Beaches	Counteroffensive, Phase V
Company A additionally entitled to:	Counteroffensive, Phase VI
Luzon	Tet 69/Counteroffensive
Philippine Presidential Unit Citation	Summer-Fall 1969
Company B additionally entitled to:	Winter-Spring 1970
Nijmegen 1944	Sanctuary Counteroffensive
	Counteroffensive, Phase VII
	Cross of Gallantry with Palm
	Company B additionally entitled to:
	Civil Actions Honor Medal (1st Class)

=== Decorations ===
Valorous Unit Award	Meritorious Unit Commendation (7)	Army Superior Unit Award
Afghanistan	France 1944	15 Oct - 19 Dec 1984
17 Jan - 17 Aug 2003	Vietnam 1966-1967
	Vietnam 1967-1968
	Vietnam 1968-1969
	Vietnam 1969-1970
	Vietnam 1971
	Southwest Asia

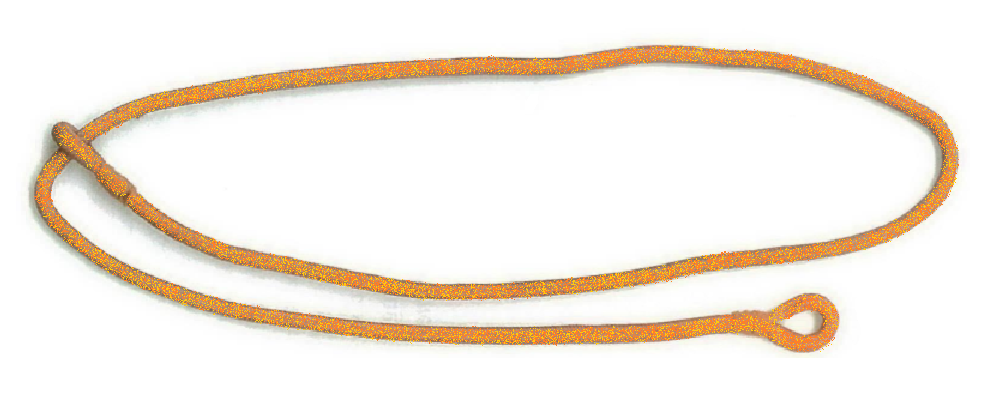
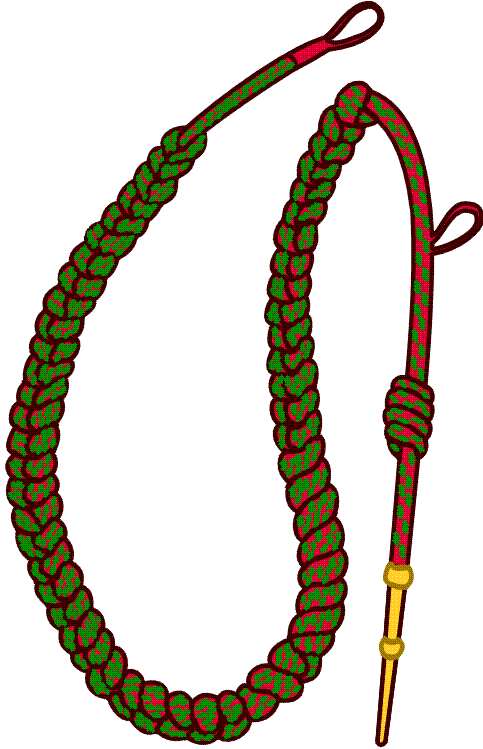
A Company Additionally Entitled to	B Company Additionally Entitled to	C Company Additionally Entitled to	E Company (LRSD) Additionally Entitled to
Valorous Unit Award Afghanistan; 17 January - 17 August 2003	Presidential Unit Citation Iraq; 28 April - 1 May 2003	Valorous Unit Award Iraq; 1 August 2003 – 31 March 2004	Valorous Unit Award Afghanistan; 17 January - 17 August 2003
Philippine Presidential; Unit Citation 17 October 1944 – 4 July 1945	Valorous Unit Award Iraq; 7 May 2003 – 15 February 2004
	Netherlands Orange Lanyard Operation Market Garden
	Belgian Fourragère Action in the Ardennes; Action in Belgium and Germany

== Heraldry ==
=== Coat of arms ===
Blazon

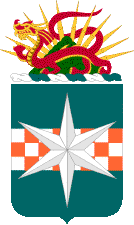
Coat of arms

The coat of arms features an Azure (teal blue) shield with an ordinary of an Argent (white) and Tenné (orange) checkered fess. The charge of the shield is an Argent six-pointed mullet of the second. Atop the shield rests an Argent and Azure rolled wreath which forms the base of the crest featuring a Gules (red) dragon trimmed in Or (gold) in a passant posture. The dragon stands in front of a Vert (green) mountain which is impaled with twelve Proper bamboo spikes while the dragon's tail is interlaced through the spikes.

Symbolism

Azure and white are the colors used for units not assigned to a branch, referring to the unit's previous designation as the 313th ASA Battalion. The colors orange and white express the organization's former affiliation with the Signal Corps and the six points of the mullet allude to the battalion's decorations for World War II and Vietnam service.. The dragon symbolizes alertness and readiness, and its Asian styling denotes the unit's service in Vietnam. The green mountain represents the lush vegetation and mountainous terrain while the twelve bamboo spikes represent the twelve campaigns the battalion participated in during the Vietnam war.

=== Distinctive unit insignia ===
Blazon

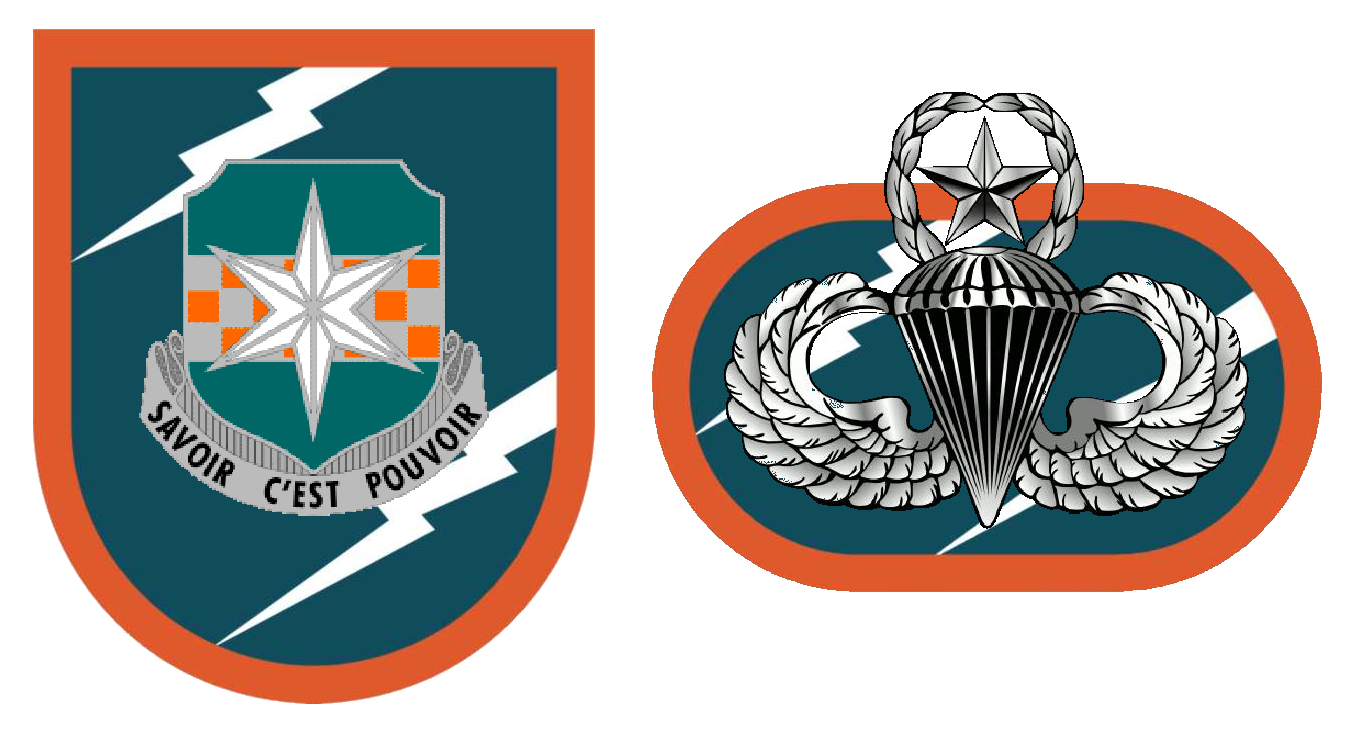
Flash with DUI (left) and background oval with master parachutist badge (right)

The unit's distinctive unit insignia (DUI) is a silver color metal and enamel device 1 1/8 inches (2.9 cm) in height overall consisting of a shield representing the unit's coat of arms with a silver scroll attached around the sides and bottom of the shield inscribed, "SAVOIR C'EST POUVOIR" (Knowledge is power, in French) with black-colored lettering.

=== Beret flash and background trimming ===
The 313th's flash is a teal blue shield-shaped embroidered item with a semi-circular base. Around the edge of the flash is a 1/8 inch (0.32 cm) orange border, two white lightning bolts bendwise sinister, one issuing from the top of the flash and one issuing from the lower right side; the overall dimensions are 2 1/4 inches (5.7 cm) in height by 1 7/8 inches (4.8 cm) in width. The airborne background trimming is a teal blue oval-shaped embroidered item edged with a 1/8 inch (0.32 cm) orange border two white lightning bolts bendwise sinister, one issuing from the top of the item and one issuing from the right side. The overall dimensions are 1 3/8 inches (3.5 cm) in height by 2 1/4 inches (5.7 cm) width.

== See also ==
- T-10 parachute
- US signals intelligence in the Cold War
