= Project SHAMROCK =

Cold-War era US espionage exercise

Project SHAMROCK was a United States government domestic espionage project operated by the predecessor to the National Security Agency (NSA) between the 1940s and 1970s. Project SHAMROCK was the sister project to Project MINARET, an espionage exercise started in August 1945. Project MINARET involved the accumulation of all telegraphic data that entered or exited the United States. The Armed Forces Security Agency (AFSA) and its successor, the NSA, were given direct access to daily microfilm copies of all incoming, outgoing, and transiting telegrams via the Western Union and its associates RCA and ITT. NSA did the operational interception, and, if there was information that would be of interest to other intelligence agencies, the material was passed to them. Intercepted messages were disseminated to the FBI, CIA, Secret Service, Bureau of Narcotics and Dangerous Drugs (BNDD), and the Department of Defense. No court authorized the operation and there were no warrants.

== Operations ==
According to military historian Stephen Budiansky, the precursor to the project occurred in 1940: "In January 1940 the Army's adjutant general sent a letter to the president of RCA, David Sarnoff, asking if a Lieutenant Earle F. Cook might be assigned to the company..." Cook photographed all international commercial cablegrams. "The clandestine arrangement—almost certainly illegal—set a precedent..." Official wartime censorship began in Dec. 1940, when all cables were "turned over to the government for inspection." According to Louis W. Tordella, "the collection program 'just ran on' ever since its beginning in World War II 'without a great deal of attention from anyone'..." Three major cable companies provided copies of all international telegrams passing through New York, Washington, and San Francisco. In the 1950s, "New Shamrock" tapped the links of 60–70 foreign embassies.

According to FBI historian Athan Theoharis, the post-World War II continuation of Project SHAMROCK brought hesitation from the telegraph companies, who were concerned about the legality of their actions and that employees would reveal the companies' government cooperation to the public. Their fears were assuaged after a promise from Attorney General Tom Clark that the U.S. government would not prosecute the companies for their participation in Project SHAMROCK, and after Congress approved a bill section that made it illegal for "unauthorized" individuals to reveal information related to code-breaking, which was a part of SHAMROCK's operations.

At the height of Project SHAMROCK, 150,000 messages were printed and analyzed by NSA personnel in a month.

== Investigation ==
In May 1975 however, Congressional critics began to investigate and expose the program. As a result, NSA director Lew Allen terminated it, on his own authority rather than that of other intelligence agencies. According to Budiansky, a 1977 US Department of Justice review concluded wiretap laws were violated, but "If the intelligence agencies possessed too much discretionary authority with too little accountability, that would seem to be a 35-year failing of Presidents and the Congress rather than the agencies or their personnel."

The testimony of both the representatives from the cable companies and of director Allen at the hearings prompted Senate Intelligence Committee chairman Senator Frank Church to conclude that Project SHAMROCK was "probably the largest government interception program affecting Americans ever undertaken."

One result of these investigations was the 1978 creation of the Foreign Intelligence Surveillance Act (FISA) which limited the powers of the NSA and put in place a process of warrants and judicial review. Another internal safeguard was United States Signals Intelligence Directive 18 (USSID 18), an internal NSA and intelligence community set of procedures, originally issued in 1980.

USSID 18 was the general guideline for handling signal intelligence (SIGINT) inadvertently collected on US citizens, without a warrant, prior to the George W. Bush administration. The post-Clinton era interpretations of FISA and USSID 18's principles assume that the executive branch has unitary authority for warrantless surveillance. This assertion came under congressional investigation as an apparent violation of FISA's intent.

== See also ==
- COINTELPRO
- DCSNet
- ECHELON
- FBI Index
- Main Core
- PRISM
- Stellar Wind
- ThinThread
- Trailblazer Project
- Turbulence
- Warrantless searches in the United States
