= Tom Wicker =

American journalist and novelist (1926–2011)

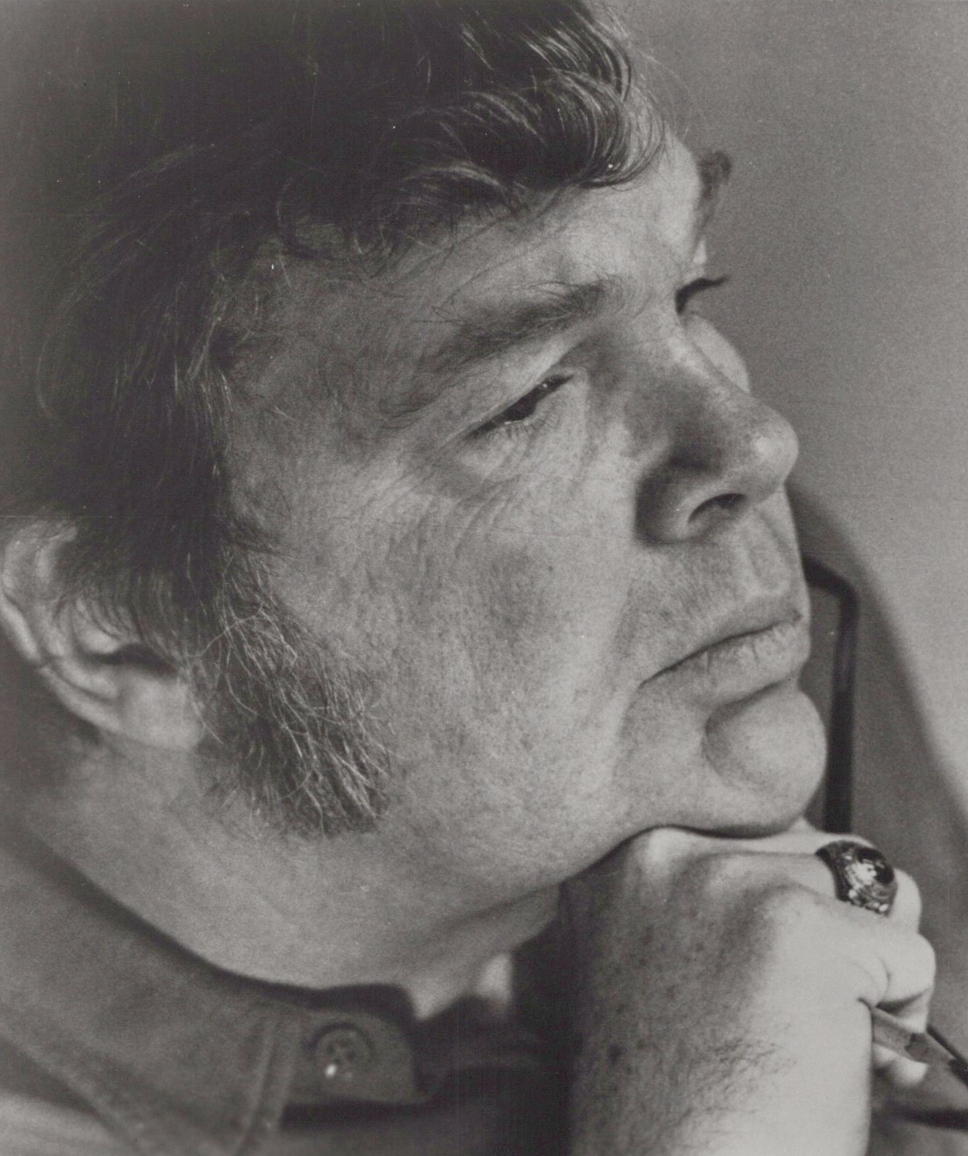
- Wicker in 1973
- Born: Thomas Grey Wicker; June 18, 1926; Hamlet, North Carolina, U.S.
- Died: November 25, 2011 (aged 85); Rochester, Vermont, U.S.
- Other name: Paul Connolly
- Education: University of North Carolina; Harvard University
- Occupation: Journalist
- Known for: Political reporter and columnist for The New York Times

Thomas Grey Wicker (June 18, 1926 – November 25, 2011) was an American journalist. He was best known as a political reporter and columnist for The New York Times for nearly three decades.

Besides writing non-fiction books about U.S. presidential history and race relations, he wrote ten novels, including mysteries and political thrillers.

== Early life and education ==
Wicker was born on June 18, 1926, in Hamlet, North Carolina, to Delancey David, a railroad freight conductor, and Esta Cameron Wicker. He served in the Navy in World War II. He was a 1948 graduate of the University of North Carolina. In 1957, Wicker won a Nieman Fellowship at Harvard University. In 1993, he returned to Harvard, where he was a fellow at Harvard Kennedy School.

== Career ==
=== The New York Times ===
Wicker began his journalism career in 1949, first serving as editor of the small-town Sandhill Citizen in Aberdeen, North Carolina. He eventually worked for other newspapers, including The Winston-Salem Journal and The Nashville Tennessean. By the early 1960s, he had joined The New York Times. On the day of President Kennedy's assassination in November 1963, Wicker was a relatively unknown White House correspondent in Dallas. But he quickly vaulted to national prominence when he wrote The New York Times lead story the following morning, after having ridden in a press bus in the motorcade that accompanied Kennedy. He would later be interviewed for the 1992 documentary Beyond 'JFK': The Question of Conspiracy. In September 1964, Wicker was named Washington bureau chief for the Times upon the recommendation of his boss and mentor James Reston.

Wicker was an observer of the Washington, D.C. scene. In that capacity, his influential "In the Nation" column ran in the Times from 1966 until his retirement at the end of 1991. In a final Q & A interview with fellow Times reporter R. W. Apple, Wicker reflected on lessons he had learned during his years covering Washington. He was asked whether he had any "heroes" in political life:

I think it tends to work the other way. Which doesn't mean that I look at all those people with contempt—quite the opposite. But the journalist's perspective makes you see the feet of clay and the warts, and that's a good thing. I found them in many cases to be truly engaging human beings and admirable persons but not really, in the long run, impeccable heroes, or even just heroes without the "impeccable." We should try to see people as clearly as we can. Then if a hero does come into view, why, we can give him his due.

Wicker also spoke about the constraints of working for one of America's elite press outlets. In a 1985 Harper's Magazine forum titled "Can the Press Tell the Truth?", he agreed with journalist Sidney Zion that national press members were like a "League of Gentlemen" who did not wish to undermine the government's interpretation of events or to offend other gentlemen in the League. Wicker said: "Sure, someone could write a two-line memo tomorrow to be more skeptical and challenging of established institutions. But they won't do it, not because they don't have the power to do it, but because they don't want to suffer more than the minimal necessary disapproval of the League of Gentlemen."

=== Books ===
External videos
- Booknotes interview with Wicker on One of Us: Richard Nixon and the American Dream, April 7, 1991, C-SPAN

Wicker wrote numerous books throughout his life. He is the author of several about U.S. presidents, including:

- Kennedy Without Tears: The Man Beneath the Myth (1964)
- JFK & LBJ: The Influence of Personality Upon Politics (1966)
- One of Us: Richard Nixon and the American Dream (1991)
- Dwight D. Eisenhower (2002)
- George Herbert Walker Bush (2004)

Other works by Wicker include:

- The Kingpin (1953), a novel about politics
- The Devil Must (1957), a novel
- The Judgment (1961), a novel
- Facing the Lions (1973), a novel about a presidential campaign involving a candidate modeled on Sen. Estes Kefauver
- A Time to Die: The Attica Prison Revolt (1975), this book recounted the events in September 1971 at the Attica Correctional Facility in Attica, New York; it won an Edgar Award from the Mystery Writers of America for Best Fact Crime book and inspired a 1980 made-for-TV movie.
- On Press: A Top Reporter's Life in, and Reflections on, American Journalism (1978)
- Unto This Hour (1984), a novel of the American Civil War, during the Second Battle of Bull Run (1862)
- Donovan's Wife (1992), a novel about the sleazy side of politics
- Prison Writing in 20th-Century America (1992)
- Tragic Failure: Racial Integration in America (1996)
- Easter Lilly: A Novel of the South Today (1998), a novel about a murder in the South
- On the Record: An Insider’s Guide to Journalism (2001)
- Shooting Star: The Brief Arc of Joe McCarthy (2006)

In addition, Wicker wrote three detective novels in the 1950s under the pseudonym "Paul Connolly":

- Get Out of Town (1951)
- Tears Are for Angels (1952), ISBN 978-1944520922
- So Fair, So Evil (1955), ISBN 978-1954840034

== Politics ==
Wicker's journalism for The New York Times earned him a place on the master list of Nixon's political opponents. Wicker later wrote an essay on Richard Nixon for the book Character Above All: Ten Presidents from FDR to George Bush (1996).

Wicker was mentioned in a 60 Minutes report from the 1970s which detailed how he, along with other journalists and members of Congress who publicly supported desegregation busing, had nevertheless sent their children to Washington, D.C. private schools.

== NSA monitoring of Wicker's communications ==
In a secret operation code-named "Project MINARET", the National Security Agency (NSA) monitored the communications of leading Americans, including Wicker and other prominent U.S. journalists, Senators Frank Church and Howard Baker, civil rights leaders like Martin Luther King Jr., and famous American athletes like Muhammad Ali who criticized the Vietnam War. A subsequent review by NSA of its Minaret program concluded that the program was "disreputable if not outright illegal".

== Death ==
Wicker died from an apparent heart attack, on November 25, 2011, at the age of 85.
