= TRAFFICTHIEF =

Trafficthief (stylized TRAFFICTHIEF) is a database maintained by the United States' National Security Agency (NSA) and operated under the Turbulence program, containing "Meta-data from a subset of tasked strong-selectors," according to an XKeyscore presentation. An example of a strong selector is an email address. In other words, it would be a database of the metadata associated with names, phone numbers, email addresses, and other identifying information that intelligence services are specifically targeting. Journalist Marc Ambinder speculates the program is a "raw SIGINT viewer for data analysis."

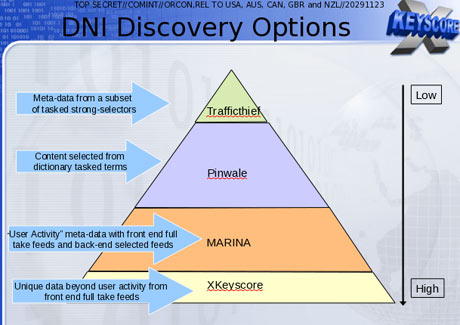
A reference to TRAFFICTHIEF in an XKeyscore slide
