= Lew Allen =

US Air Force general (1925–2010)

Lew Allen Jr.
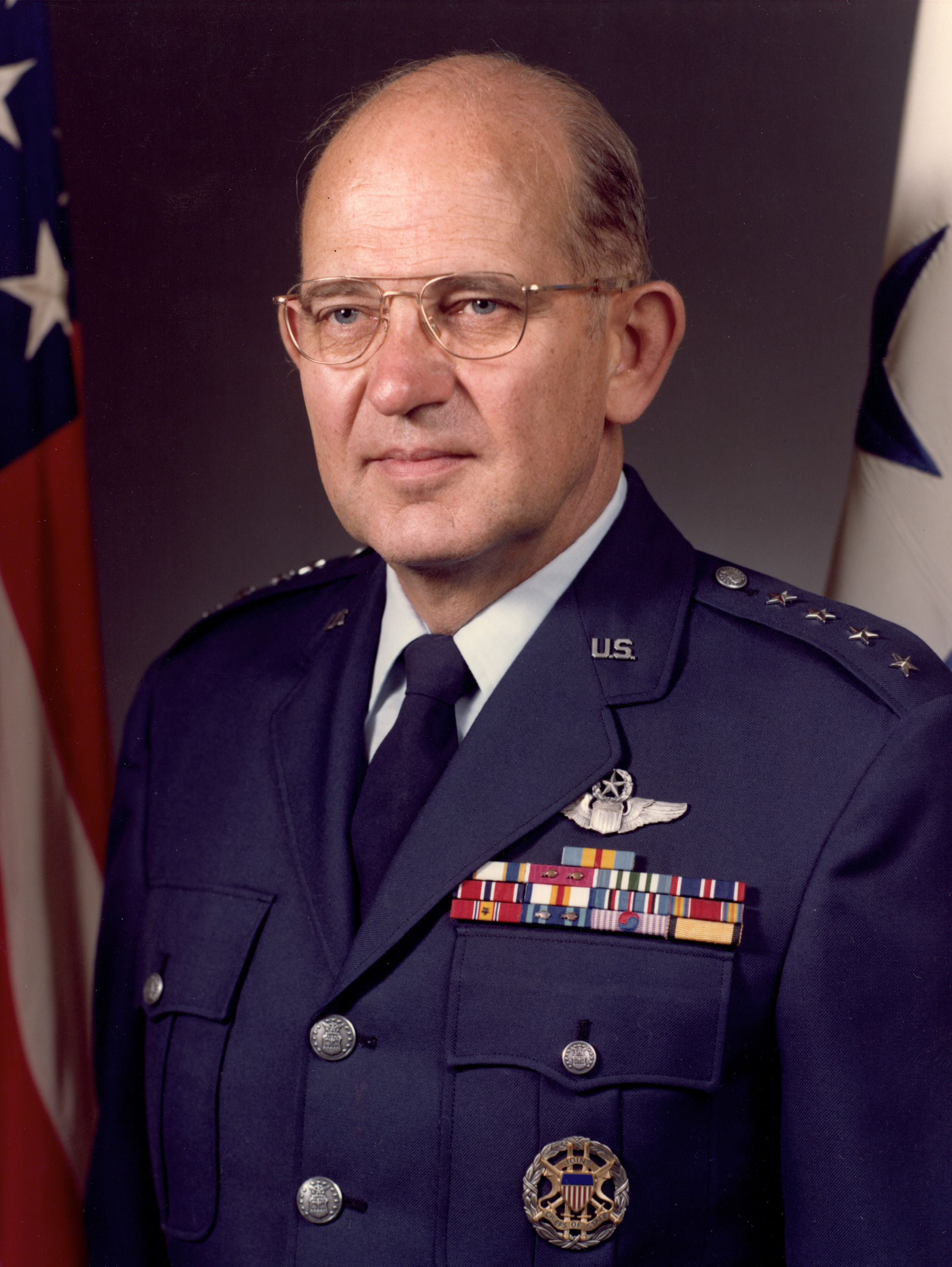
- 10th Chief of Staff of the Air Force (1978–1982)
- Born: 30 September 1925; Miami, Florida, U.S.
- Died: 4 January 2010 (aged 84); Potomac Falls, Virginia, U.S.
- Burial place: Arlington National Cemetery
- Military career
- Allegiance: United States
- Branch: United States Air Force
- Service years: 1943–1982
- Rank: General
- Commands: Chief of Staff of the United States Air Force; Vice Chief of Staff of the United States Air Force; National Security Agency; Air Force Systems Command
- Conflicts: World War II
- Awards: Defense Distinguished Service Medal (2); Air Force Distinguished Service Medal (2); Legion of Merit (3)
- Other work: Jet Propulsion Laboratory; President's Foreign Intelligence Advisory Board

Lew Allen Jr. (30 September 1925 – 4 January 2010) was a United States Air Force four-star general who served as the tenth Chief of Staff of the United States Air Force. As chief of staff, Allen served as the senior uniformed Air Force officer responsible for the organization, training, and equipping of 750,000 active duty Air Force, Air National Guard, Air Force Reserve, and civilian personnel serving in the United States and overseas. As a member of the Joint Chiefs of Staff, he and the other service chiefs were the military advisers to the Secretary of Defense, the National Security Council, and the president.

== Early life and education ==
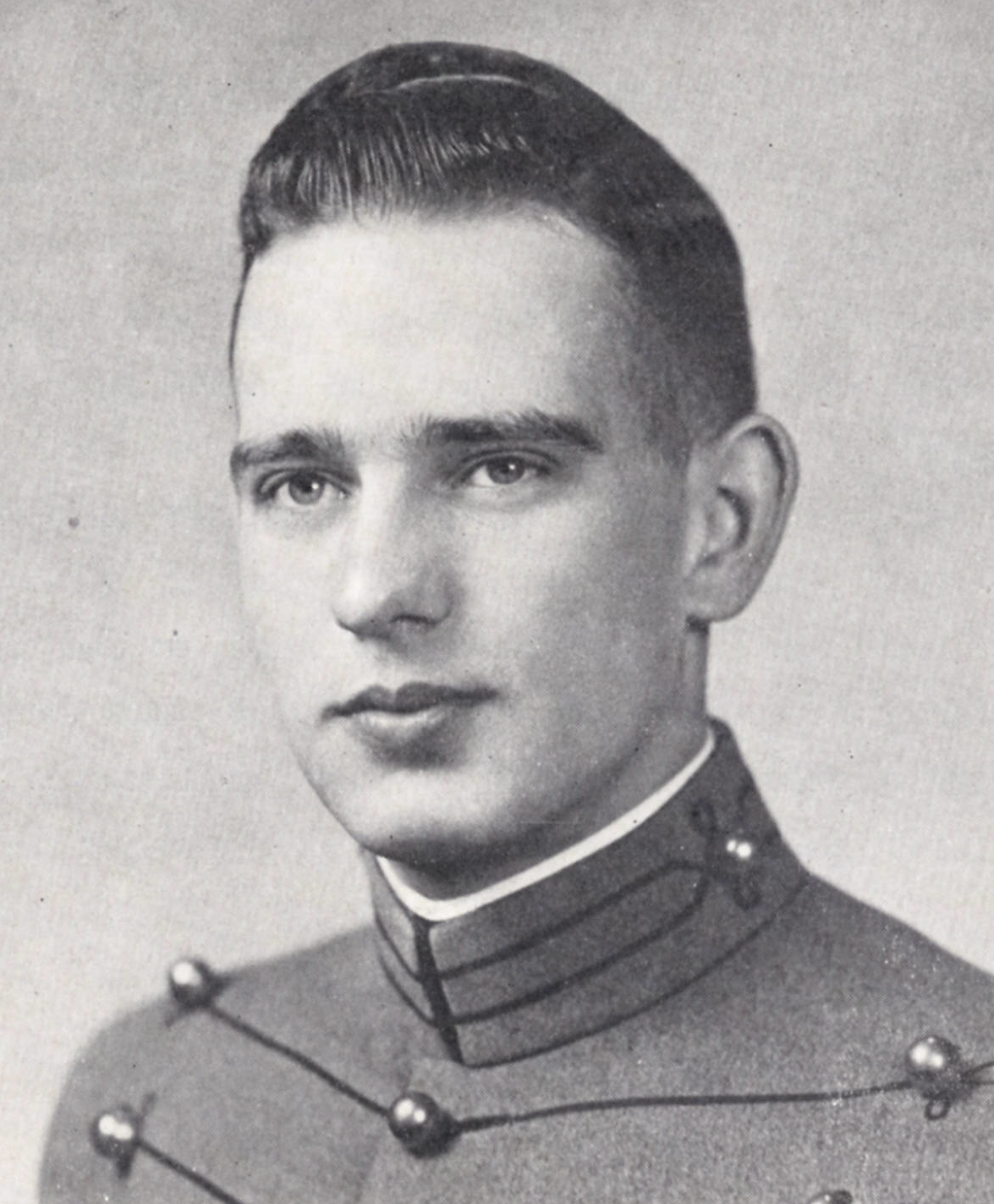
Allen as a United States Military Academy cadet c. 1946

Born in Miami, Florida, Allen attended and graduated from high school in Gainesville, Texas, in 1942. He entered the United States Military Academy, in 1943, and he graduated in 1946 with a Bachelor of Science degree and a commission as a second lieutenant. He was awarded his pilot's wings upon his graduation from flight training.

== Military career ==
After completing multi-engine flight training in November 1946, Allen was assigned to Strategic Air Command's 7th Bombardment Group at Carswell Air Force Base, Texas, where he flew B-29 Superfortress bombers, and then the new and very long-range Convair B-36 bomber. Allen also served in various technical positions in the area of nuclear weapons. Allen also attended the Air Tactical Course at Tyndall Air Force Base, Florida, and next he returned to Carswell Air Force Base as a flight instructor and as an assistant Special Weapons Officer for the 7th Bombardment Wing.

In September 1950, Allen entered the University of Illinois for graduate study in nuclear physics. He completed his Master of Science degree in 1952. Allen continued his graduate study, and he earned his PhD in physics in 1954 under the direction of Alfred O. Hanson. He had completed an experimental thesis on high-energy photonuclear reactions. Allen then was assigned to the U.S. Atomic Energy Commission's Los Alamos Scientific Laboratory in Los Alamos, New Mexico, as a physicist in the Test Division, where he became acquainted with the bomb designer Ted Taylor. Allen conducted experiments in several different nuclear test series. These experiments concerned the physics of thermonuclear weapons design and to the effects of high altitude nuclear explosions conceivably to be used for ballistic missile defense.

From June 1957 to December 1961, Allen was assigned to Kirtland Air Force Base, New Mexico, as the science adviser to the Physics Division of the Air Force Special Weapons Center. ("Special weapons" is a euphemism for nuclear and thermonuclear bombs.) Allen specialized in the military effects of high altitude nuclear explosions and participated in several nuclear weapons test series. He was scientific director of a major experiment that utilized a large series of high-altitude rockets to measure the characteristics of electrons trapped in the geomagnetic field after an exoatmospheric nuclear burst.

Allen was assigned in December 1961 to the Office of the Secretary of Defense, Space Technology Office, in the Directorate of Research and Engineering, Washington, D.C. From June 1965 to February 1973, he was assigned to the Office of the Secretary of the Air Force, initially in Los Angeles, California, as the deputy director for advanced plans in the Directorate of Special Projects. Allen next moved to The Pentagon in June 1968 as the deputy director of space systems, and in June 1969, he became the director. He returned to Los Angeles in September 1970 as the assistant to the director of special projects and in April 1971 became the director of special projects, with additional duty as the deputy commander for satellite programs of the Space and Missile Systems Organization.

After serving briefly as the chief of staff for the Air Force Systems Command at Andrews Air Force Base, Maryland, Allen was appointed in March 1973 as a deputy to the Director of Central Intelligence for the Intelligence Community in Washington, D.C. In August 1973, Allen became the director of the National Security Agency (NSA) and the chief of the Central Security Service at Fort George G. Meade, Maryland. Allen's tenure as the NSA director was noteworthy in that he became the first director to ever testify publicly before Congress. In August 1977, he was named commander of Air Force Systems Command.

Allen served as the Vice Chief of Staff of the United States Air Force from April 1978 until he became the Chief of Staff of the Air Force in July 1978. His nomination was unusual in that he had never served in an overseas or combat assignment, and most of his positions were in specialized technical activities, rather than in the usual command structure of the Air Force. Also, he was the last chief of staff with a bomber background; all subsequent chiefs of staff except General Norton Schwartz have been fighter pilots, and this trend is reflected by the Service's weapon budgets, which devote most funding to fighters rather than bombers.

== Retirement ==
Allen did not believe that crewed spaceflight was useful. He reportedly told a manned spaceflight engineer that he had helped cancel Manned Orbiting Laboratory in the 1960s, and would have canceled the Space Shuttle program. Following his retirement from the Air Force in 1982, Allen became the director of the Jet Propulsion Laboratory (JPL), during part of the Voyager Program (space probes launched in 1977), and he served as the director of the JPL until 1990.

Allen was a member of the National Academy of Engineering and the Council on Foreign Relations.

From 1993 to 1995, Allen served as a member of the President's Foreign Intelligence Advisory Board (PFIAB) and the Intelligence Oversight Board.

Allen was awarded the 1999 Distinguished Graduate Award of the Association of Graduates, the alumni association of West Point graduates.

Allen died in Potomac Falls, Virginia, on 4 January 2010, of complications from rheumatoid arthritis. He was buried at Arlington National Cemetery on March 22, 2010.

== Legacy ==
The United States Air Force created the General Lew Allen, Jr. Trophy in Allen's honor, which is awarded annually to an Officer and a Senior NCO in the aircraft maintenance or munitions career fields directly involved with setting up aircraft sorties.

In 1983, Allen received the Golden Plate Award of the American Academy of Achievement.

Since 1986, the Jet Propulsion Laboratory awards in his honor the Lew Allen Award for Excellence, until 1990 called the Director's Research Achievement Award.

Minor planet 4125 Lew Allen is named in his honor.

== Awards and decorations ==
Command Air Force Pilot Badge
Master Missile Badge
Joint Chiefs of Staff Badge
Defense Distinguished Service Medal with bronze oak leaf cluster
Air Force Distinguished Service Medal with bronze oak leaf cluster
Legion of Merit with two bronze oak leaf clusters
Joint Service Commendation Medal
Air Force Outstanding Unit Award
Air Force Organizational Excellence Award
National Intelligence Distinguished Service Medal
American Campaign Medal
World War II Victory Medal
National Defense Service Medal with bronze service star
Air Force Longevity Service Award with silver and two bronze oak leaf clusters
Order of National Security Merit, Gugseon Medal
Order of the Phoenix (Greece)

== See also ==
- Project Shamrock

Government offices
Preceded by Samuel C. Phillips	Director of the National Security Agency; 1973–1977	Succeeded by Bobby Ray Inman
Military offices
Preceded by David C. Jones	Chief of Staff of the United States Air Force; 1978–1982	Succeeded by Charles A. Gabriel
Academic offices
Preceded by Bruce C. Murray	6th Director of the Jet Propulsion Laboratory; 1982 – 1990	Succeeded by Edward C. Stone
