= Turbulence (NSA) =

United States National Security Agency information-technology project

A reference to Turbulence and Turmoil in an XKeyscore slide.

Turbulence is a United States National Security Agency (NSA) information-technology project started c. 2005. It was developed in small, inexpensive "test" pieces rather than one grand plan like its failed predecessor, the Trailblazer Project. It also includes offensive cyberwarfare capabilities, like injecting malware into remote computers. The U.S. Congress criticized the project in 2007 for having similar bureaucratic problems as the Trailblazer Project.

== Criticism ==
According to Siobhan Gorman in a 2007 Baltimore Sun article, "The conclusion in Congress, two former government officials said, was that Turbulence was over budget, not delivering and poorly led, and that there was little or no strategy to pull it all together."

== Link to Trailblazer ==
Trailblazer, the predecessor of Turbulence, had been cancelled in 2006 after a congressional investigation and a Defense Department's Inspector General's report found it over budget, wasteful, and ineffective.

One of the Trailblazer whistleblowers who helped with the inspector-general report, Thomas Andrews Drake, was later charged under the Espionage Act of 1917 for allegedly retaining five documents in his home. Two of those documents were about Turbulence; his defense pointed out that one of these documents was clearly marked "UNCLASSIFIED" and the other was declassified shortly after his indictment. Thomas Drake pleaded guilty to a misdemeanor count of unauthorized use of a computer on June 10, 2011, and was sentenced to one year probation.

== Programs ==
Turbulence includes nine core programs, of which names are known:

- TURMOIL
  - Turmoil is involved in the process of decrypting communications.
- TUTELAGE
- TRAFFICTHIEF
  - According to an XKeyscore presentation, TRAFFICTHIEF is a database of "Meta-data from a subset of tasked strong-selectors" According to the XKeyscore presentation, an example of a strong selector is an email address. In other words, it would be a database of the metadata associated with names, phone numbers, email addresses, etc., that the intelligence services are specifically targeting. Marc Ambinder gives what he calls an educated guess: "raw SIGINT viewer for data analysis."
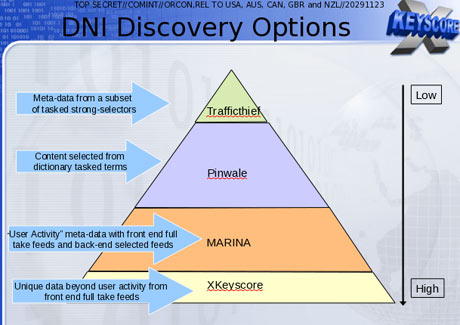
A reference to TRAFFICTHIEF in an XKeyscore slide

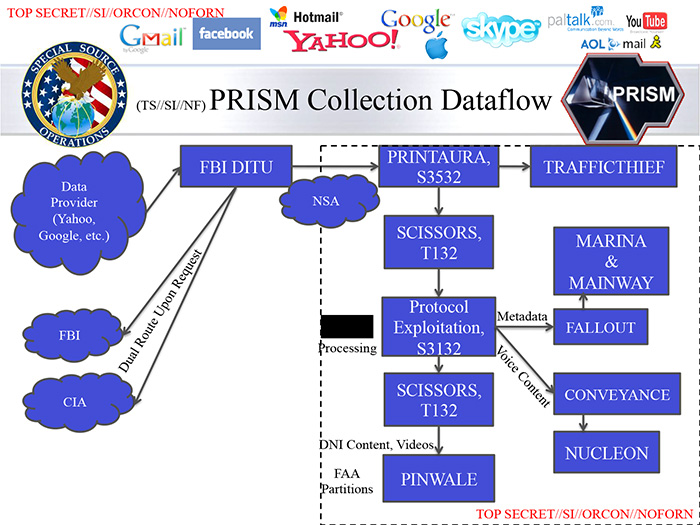
A Reference to TRAFFICTHIEF in a PRISM slide

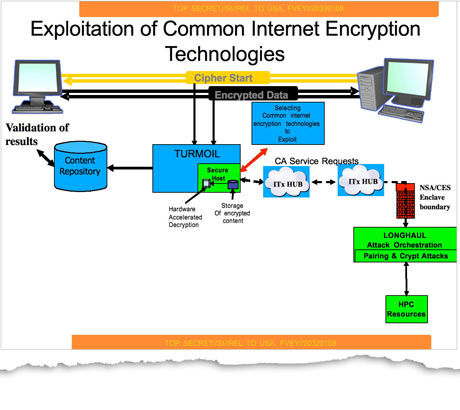
A reference to Turmoil in an NSA presentation

Memo celebrating the launch of TURBULENCE, Mentions TURMOIL, TUTELAGE, XKEYSCORE, and TAO

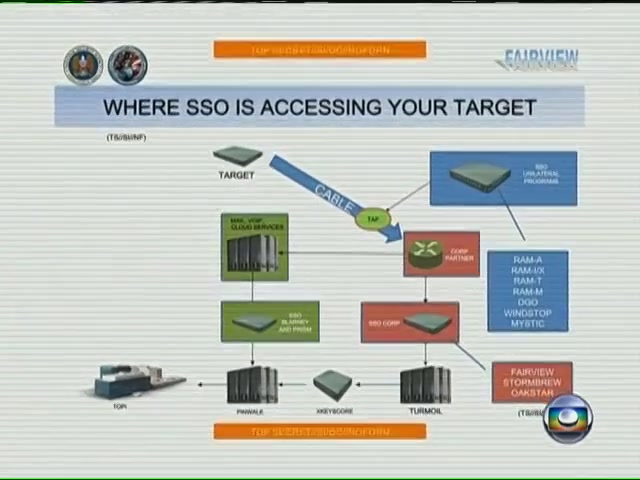
FAIRVIEW presentation: reference to TURMOIL

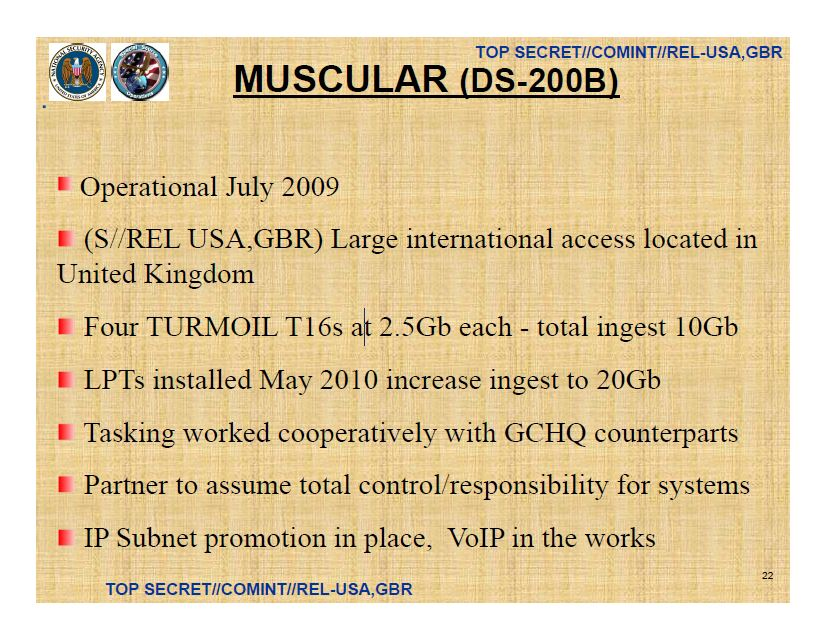
Technical details of MUSCULAR, reference to TURMOIL

== See also ==
- ECHELON
- DCSNet
- Red Hook
- Stellar Wind
- Thinthread
- William Binney
- Mark Klein
- Edward Snowden
- Thomas Tamm
- Russ Tice
