= Charles Terhune Jr. =

United States military officer

Charles H. Terhune Jr.
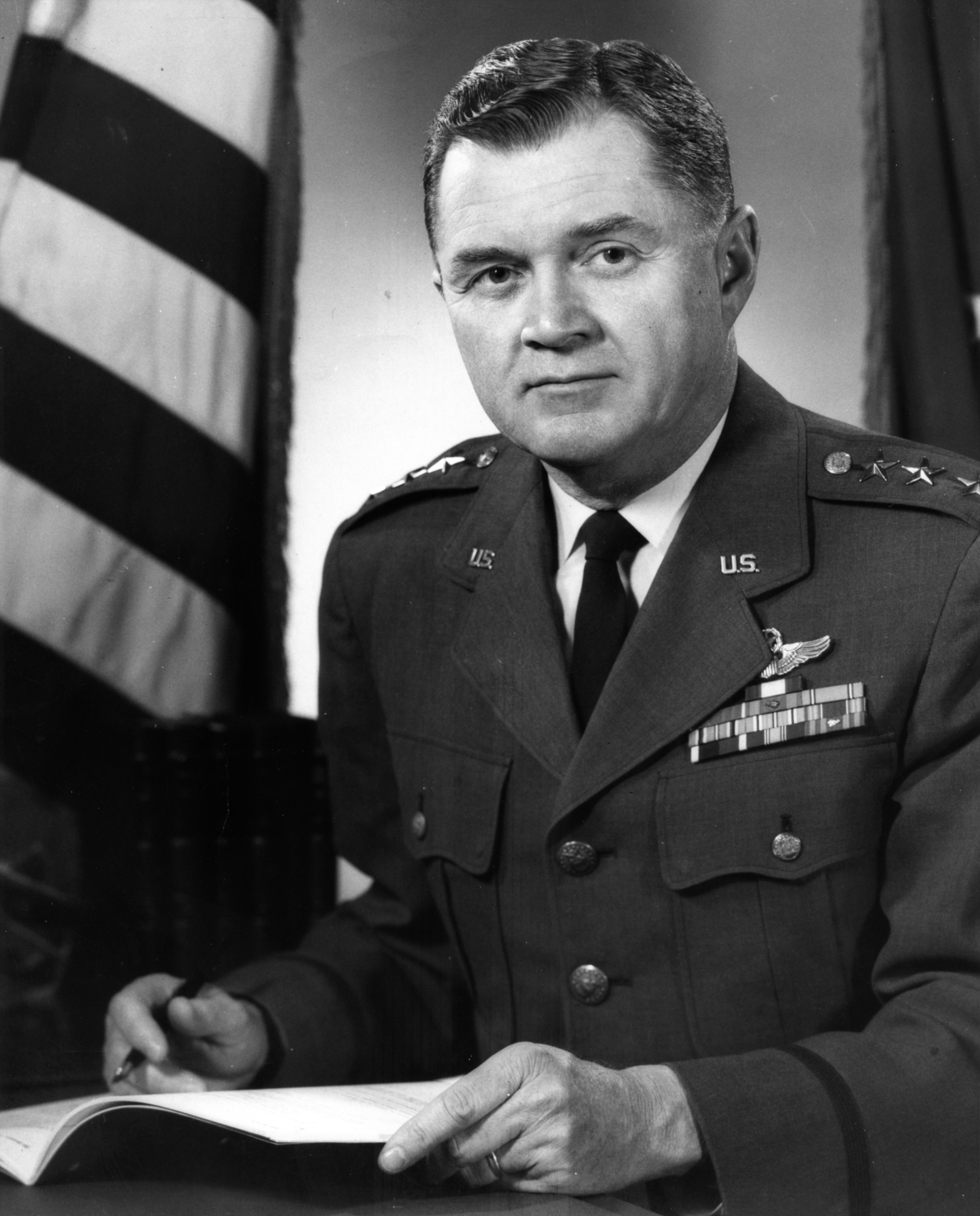
- Born: 7 May 1916; Dayton, Ohio, U.S.
- Died: 30 August 2006 (aged 90); La Canada, California, U. S.
- Burial place: San Marcos Cemetery, San Marcos, Texas, U.S.
- Military career
- Allegiance: United States
- Branch: United States Army (1938–1947); United States Air Force (1947–1969)
- Service years: 1938–1969
- Rank: Lieutenant general
- Nickname: Terry
- Conflicts: World War II; Luzon campaign; Okinawa campaign; Bombing of Japan; Occupation of Japan
- Awards: Legion of Merit; Army Distinguished Service Medal; Air Force Distinguished Service Medal; NASA Distinguished Service Medal; Air Medal (2)

Charles Houston Terhune Jr. (7 May 1916 – 30 August 2006) was a United States Air Force (USAF) lieutenant general who played an important role in the development of the American jet aircraft, guided missiles and ballistic missiles.

A 1938 graduate of Purdue University, Terhune enlisted in the United States Army Air Corps as a flying cadet, earned his wings, and was commissioned as a second lieutenant. During World War II he served at Wright Field, where he participated in the development of the Bell P-59 Airacomet and Lockheed P-80 Shooting Star, the first American jet fighters, and in 1943 he became one of the first pilots to fly a jet aircraft. In 1945 he went to the Pacific, where he flew combat missions over China and Japan from bases in the Philippines and Okinawa.

After the war Terhune worked on guided missiles at USAF Headquarters and in the Office of the Secretary of Defense as the USAF assistant to the director of guided missiles. In 1953 he became the director of development at the Air Force Special Weapons Center at Kirtland Air Force Base in New Mexico, where he was involved with the development of nuclear warheads for them. In 1954 he was assigned to the Air Force Ballistic Missile Program, and participated in the development of the Atlas, Thor, Titan and Minuteman missiles.

Terhune retired from the USAF in 1969 with the rank of lieutenant general. He worked for National Cash Register and was the deputy director of NASA's Jet Propulsion Laboratory (JPL) from 1971 to 1983.

== Early life ==
Charles Houston (Terry) Terhune Jr. was born in Dayton, Ohio, on May 7, 1916, the oldest of three children. When he was a child, the family moved to Indianapolis, Indiana, where he attended elementary school and graduated from Broad Ripple High School. He entered Purdue University, where was on the track team, running the quarter-mile race, and was co-captain of the team in his senior year. He graduated with a Bachelor of Science in Mechanical Engineering (BSME) (aeronautical) in 1938.

== World War II ==
Terhune enlisted in the United States Army Air Corps as a flying cadet. He earned his wings at Kelly Field, Texas, in May 1939, and was commissioned as a second lieutenant. He was then posted to the 1st Pursuit Group at Selfridge Field, Michigan, where he flew the Seversky P-35 and Curtiss P-36 Hawk. That year he married Beatrice Holcombe. They had two daughters, Donna and Terry Lea, and a son, Charles (Chuck) Terhune III.

In November 1939 Terhune was sent to Wright Field in Ohio, where he spent six months working in the Armament Laboratory as a range officer, testing early models of bullet-proof aircraft fuel tanks. In May 1940 he enrolled at the California Institute of Technology, where he earned a professional aeronautical engineering degree (AeE) in June 1941. He then returned to Wright Field as the chief of the Design Branch in the Aircraft Laboratory at the Army Air Forces Materiel Center for two years, and then was spent another two years in the Fighter Branch of the Engineering Division there. In this role he participated in the development of the Bell P-59 Airacomet and Lockheed P-80 Shooting Star, the first American jet fighters, and in 1943 he became one of the first pilots to fly a jet aircraft.

In May 1945 Terhune went to the Southwest Pacific Area as the executive officer of the 58th Fighter Group. He flew the Republic P-47 Thunderbolt in combat missions over China and Japan from bases in the Philippines and Okinawa, where he was stationed when the war ended in August 1945. He then participated in the occupation of Japan as commander of the 3rd Air Commando Group and the 49th Fighter Group. He then served as the chief of maintenance for the Far East Air Forces.

== Post-war ==
Terhune returned to the United States, where he became the chief of the Air to Surface Section of the Guided Missiles Branch at Headquarters United States Army Air Forces (USAAF) in Washington, D.C. in April 1947. The USAAF became the United States Air Force (USAF) in September 1947, Terhune became the chief of the Guided Missiles Branch at USAF Headquarters in 1950. In January 1951 he was assigned to the Office of the Secretary of Defense as the USAF assistant to the director of guided missiles, and in 1953 he became the director of development at the Air Force Special Weapons Center at Kirtland Air Force Base in New Mexico, where he was involved with the development of nuclear warheads for guided missiles.

In August 1954, Terhune became one of the first officers to be assigned to the Air Force Ballistic Missile Program, when he became the deputy commander of technical operations in the Western Development Division of the Air Research and Development Command, which was engaged in the development of the first American intercontinental ballistic missiles (ICBM). Following a reorganization in June 1957, the Western Development Division became the Air Force Ballistic Missile Division (AFBMD), and Terhune became its deputy commander for ballistic missiles. He became the vice commander of the AFBMD in May 1959. During his service with the WDD and the AFBMD, he was involved with the development of the Atlas, Thor, Titan and Minuteman missiles.

Terhune, who was promoted to brigadier general in 1959, chose the suppliers for the components of the Thor and Titan missiles. When the Titan missile was threatened with cancelation in 1958, the commander of the AFBMD, Major General Bernard Schriever, sent Terhune to Washington, D.C., to take the matter up with officials. Terhune briefed the Chief of Staff of the United States Air Force, General Thomas D. White, the Secretary of the Air Force, Dudley C. Sharp, the Secretary of Defense, Neil H. McElroy, and the President's Scientific Advisory Committee (PSAC) on benefits the missile. McElroy decided not to cancel it, and Titan missiles would serve on alert until August 1987.

On 12 February 1958, USAF Headquarters requested a proposal for a program to develop a solid-propellant ICBM. Terhune responded with a detailed proposal that convinced Shriever of the merits of the concept, and he in turn convinced the commander of the Air Research and Development Command (ARDC), Lieutenant General Donald L. Putt. Shriever then sent Terhune to Washington, D.C., to brief officials at USAF Headquarters and the Department of Defense. Within a week he had secured approval for the project, which became Minuteman.

In August 1960, Ternune became the deputy commander of the Air Force Command and Control Development Division of the ARDC. This was followed by duty as the vice commander of the Electronic Systems Division at L. G. Hanscom Field in Massachusetts, in April 1961, and then the commander of Electronic Systems Division in February 1962. In July 1964, he assumed command of the Aeronautical Systems Division of the Air Force Systems Command (which had absorbed the ARDC in April 1961) at what was now Wright-Patterson Air Force Base. His final assignment was as vice commander of the AFSC at Andrews Air Force Base in Maryland on 1 May 1967. He retired from the USAF in 1969 with the rank of lieutenant general.

== Later life ==
After retiring from the USAF, Terhune became the manager of administration at National Cash Register's Data Processing Division in San Diego, California. In July 1971, he became deputy director of NASA's Jet Propulsion Laboratory (JPL), serving as acting director from July to October 1982. He retired in December 1983, but continued to advise JPL as a consultant. He helped create the Arroyo Center for the Army, which subsequently became part of RAND Corporation.

Terhune's first wife died in 1990. He married the Reverend Gloryanna Hees in July 1992. They had no children, but he acquired a stepson, Rob McLinn. He died on August 30, 2006, and was buried in San Marcos City Cemetery in San Marcos, Texas. His awards and decorations included the Legion of Merit, the Army Distinguished Service Medal, Air Force Distinguished Service Medal, NASA Distinguished Service Medal and the Air Medal with an oak leaf cluster.

== Notes ==
Academic offices
| Preceded by Bruce C. Murray | Acting Director of the Jet Propulsion Laboratory; 1982 | Succeeded by Lew Allen, Jr. |
