= Jet Propulsion Laboratory =

NASA federally funded research and development center

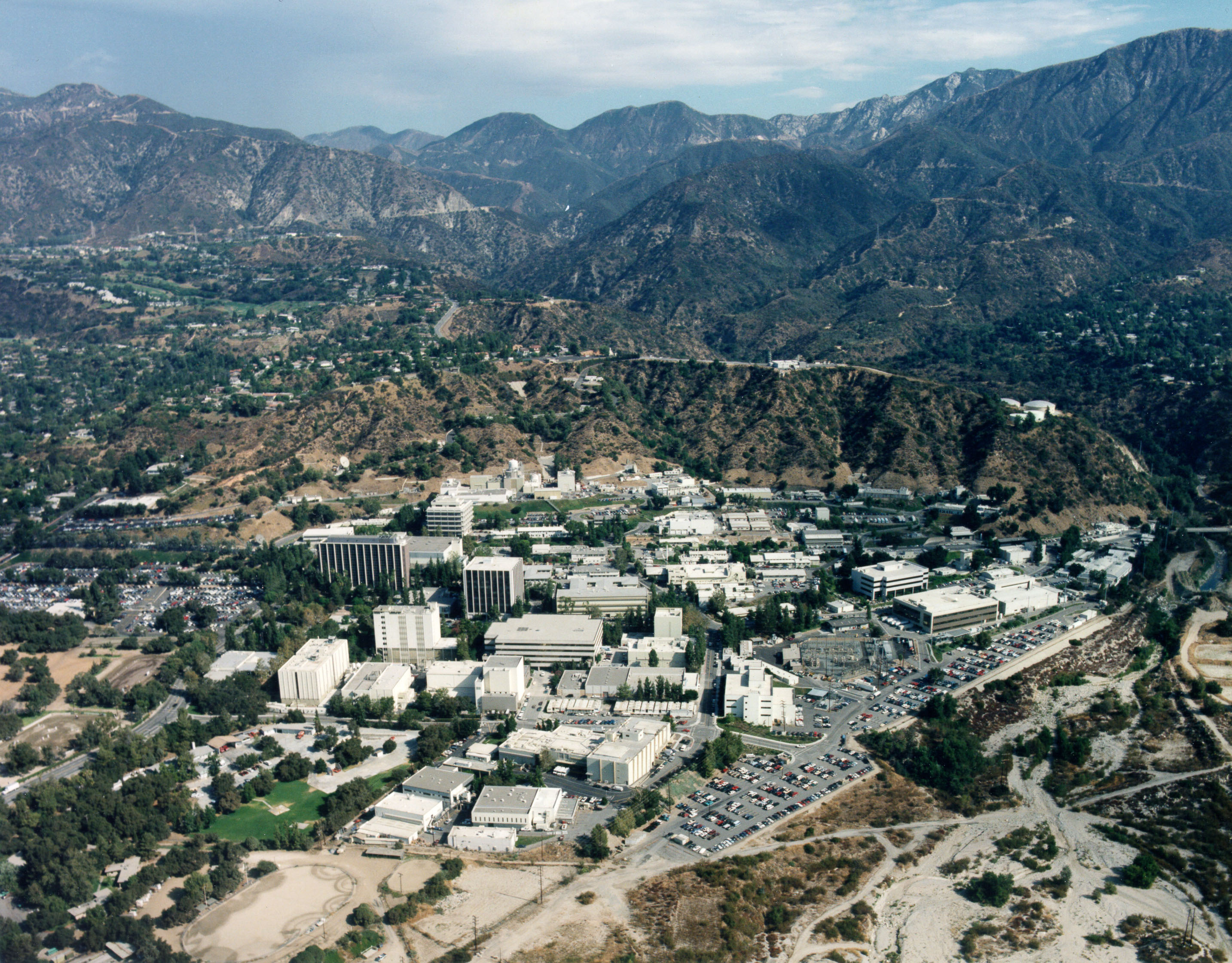
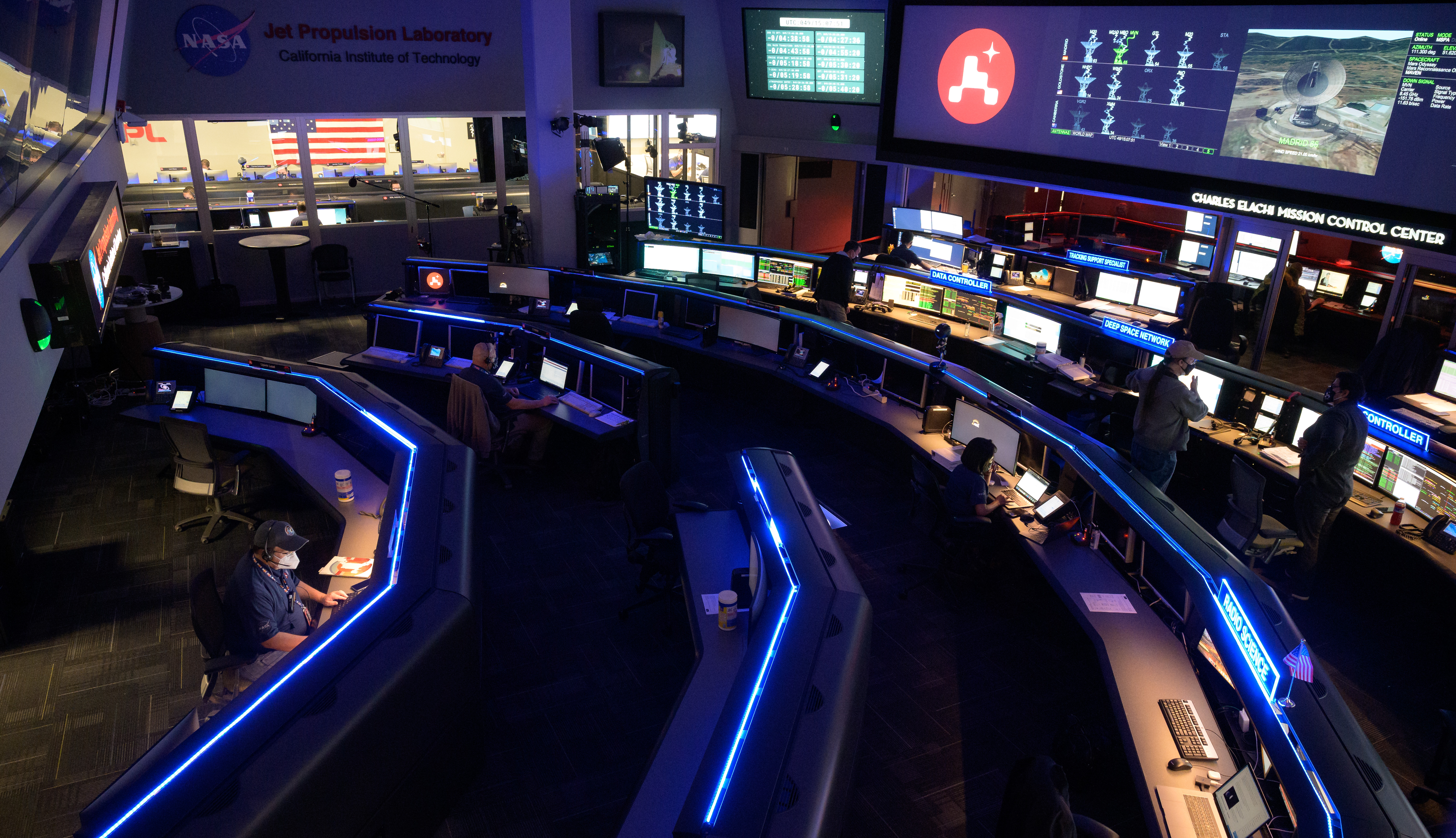
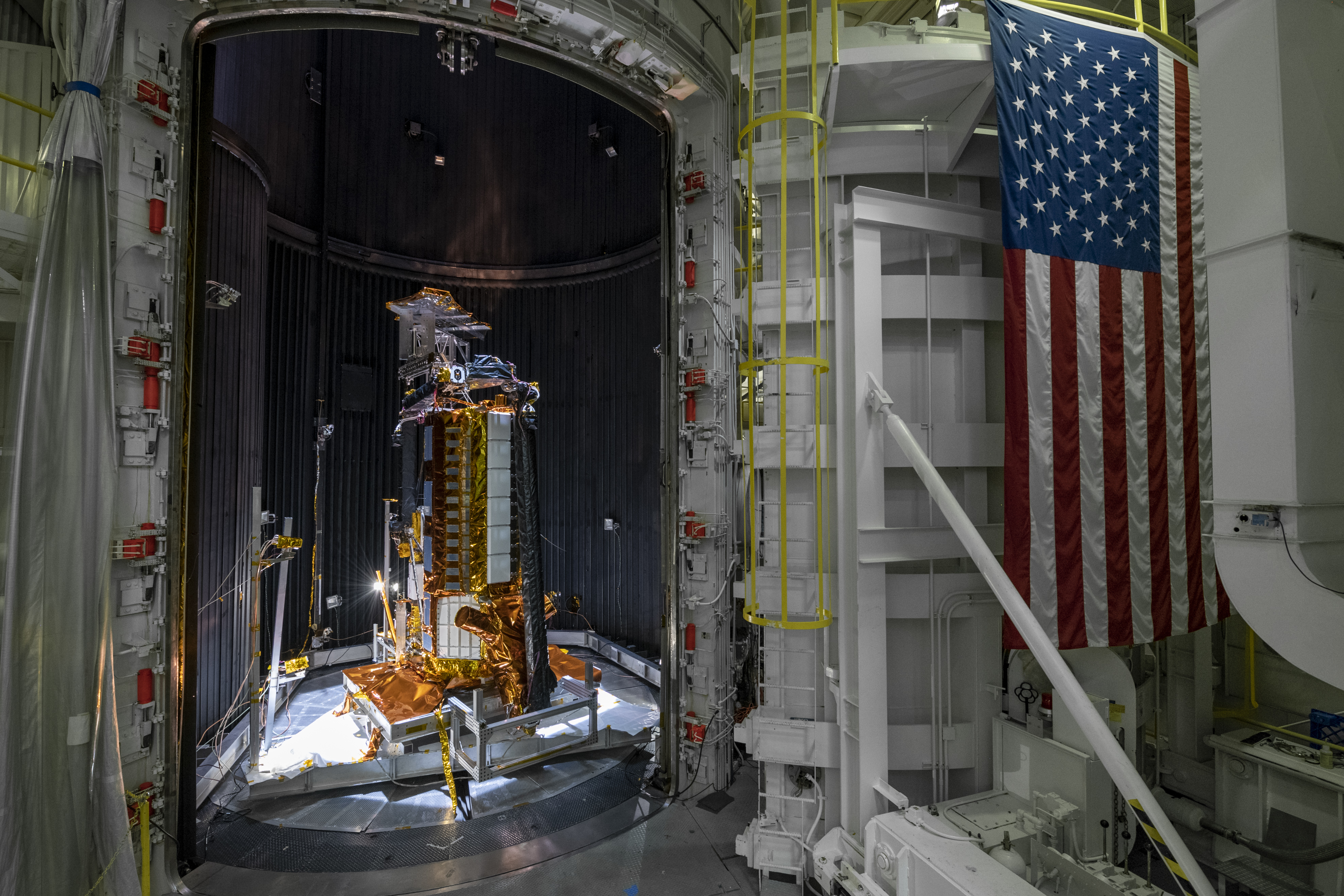
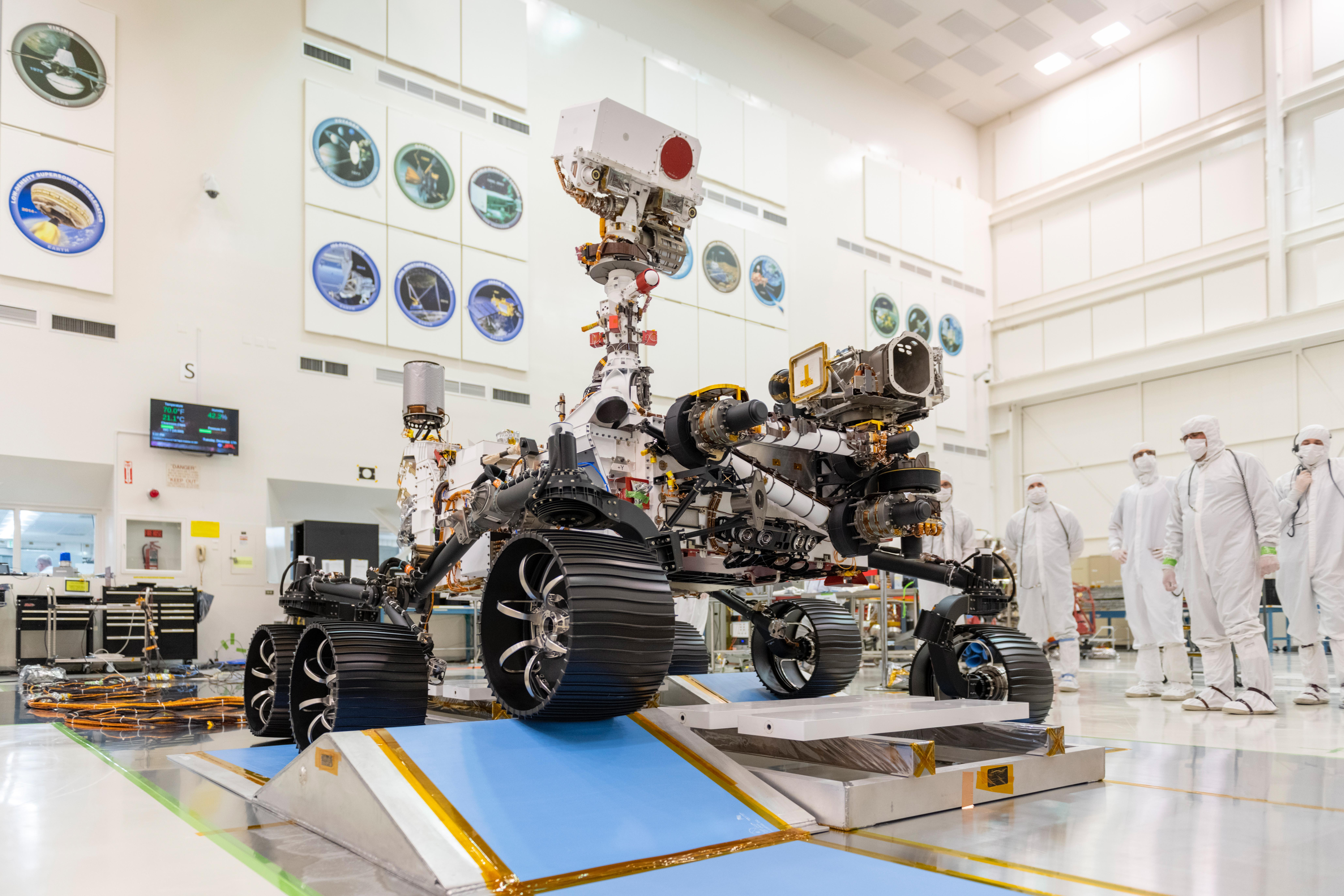
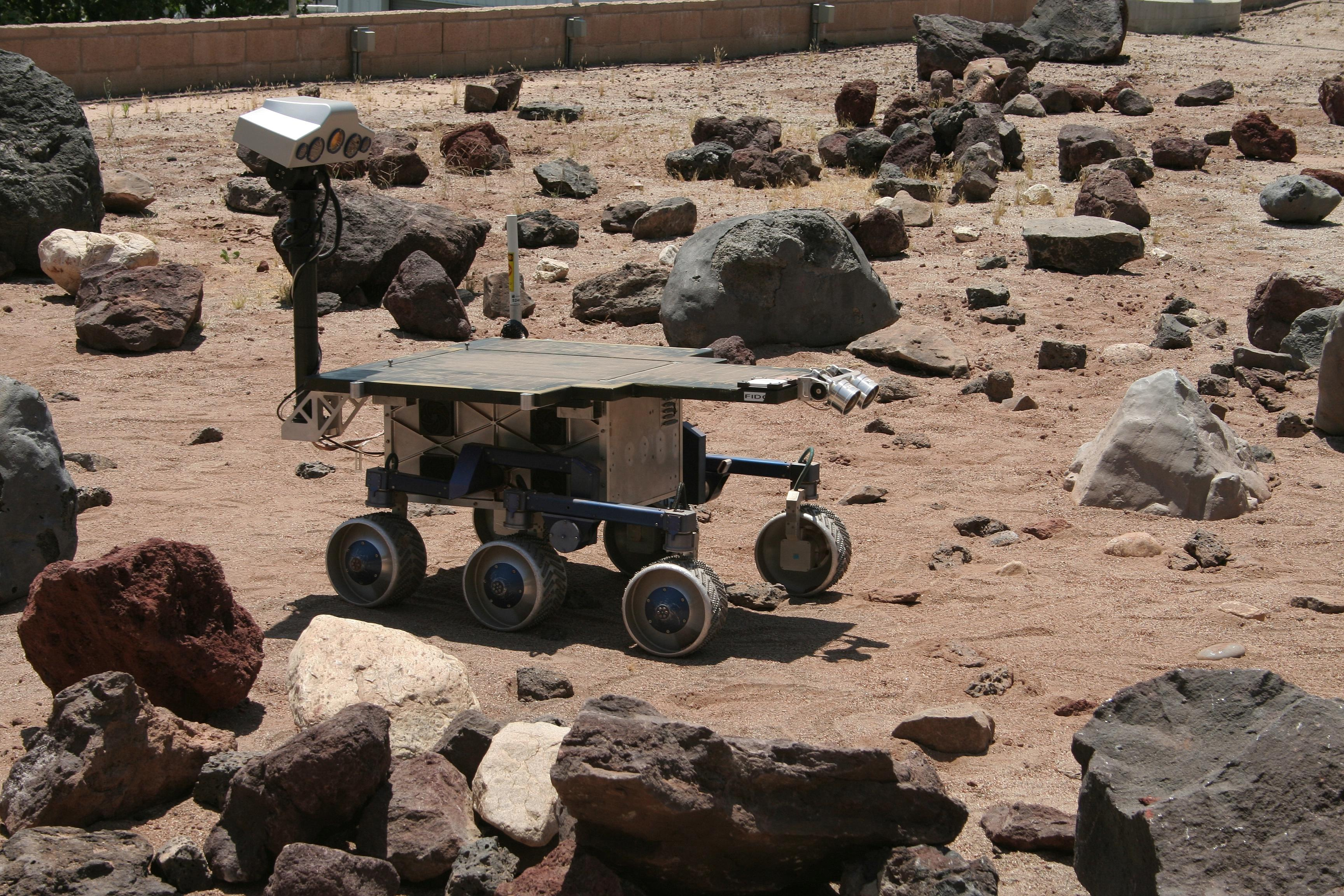
- Clockwise from the top: aerial view of JPL, NISAR testing in the Space Simulator, Sojourner at JPL's Mars Yard, Mars 2020 rover, and JPL Mission Control
- Established: October 31, 1936; 90 years ago
- Research type: Applied
- Director: Dave Gallagher
- Staff: ~4,500
- Location: 4800 Oak Grove Drive, La Cañada Flintridge, California, United States; 34°12′00″N 118°10′18″W
- Subdivision: JPL Science Division
- Operating agency: Managed for NASA by Caltech
- Website: jpl.nasa.gov

Map
- Location within the Los Angeles metropolitan area Location within California Location within the United States

The Jet Propulsion Laboratory (JPL) is a federally funded research and development center in La Cañada Flintridge, California, United States. Founded in 1936 by California Institute of Technology (Caltech) researchers, the laboratory is now owned and sponsored by NASA and administered and managed by Caltech.

The primary function of the laboratory is the construction and operation of planetary robotic spacecraft, though it also conducts Earth-orbit and astronomy missions. It is also responsible for operating the NASA Deep Space Network (DSN).

Among the major active projects at the laboratory, some are the Mars 2020 mission, which includes the Perseverance rover; the Mars Science Laboratory mission, including the Curiosity rover; the Mars Reconnaissance Orbiter; the Juno spacecraft orbiting Jupiter; the SMAP satellite for Earth surface soil moisture monitoring; the NuSTAR X-ray telescope; and the Psyche asteroid orbiter. It is also responsible for managing the JPL Small-Body Database, and provides physical data and lists of publications for all known small Solar System bodies.

JPL's Space Flight Operations Facility and Twenty-Five-Foot Space Simulator are designated National Historic Landmarks.

== History ==
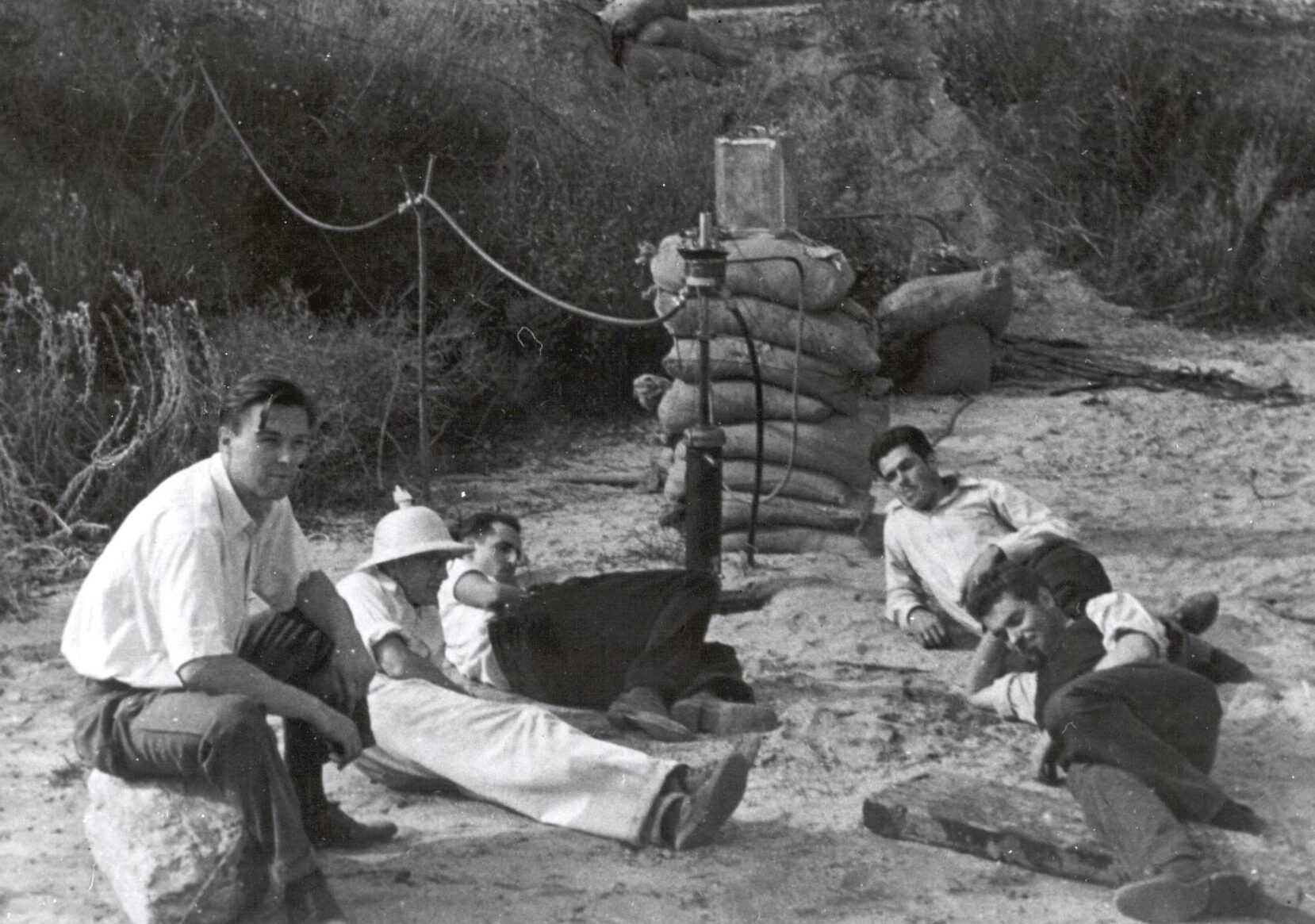
The "Suicide Squad" of (left to right) Rudolph Schott, Apollo Milton Olin Smith, Frank Malina, Ed Forman and Jack Parsons testing their first liquid-fueled rocket engine.

JPL traces its beginnings to October 31, 1936, in GALCIT (the Guggenheim Aeronautical Laboratory at the California Institute of Technology) when a group of Caltech researchers test-fired a rocket in the Arroyo Seco. This initial venture involved Caltech graduate students Frank Malina, Qian Xuesen, Weld Arnold and Apollo M. O. Smith, along with Jack Parsons and Edward S. Forman, often referred to as the "Suicide Squad" due to the dangerous nature of their experiments. Together, they tested a small, alcohol-fueled motor to gather data for Malina's graduate thesis. Malina's thesis advisor was engineer/aerodynamicist Theodore von Kármán, who eventually secured U.S. Army financial support for this "GALCIT Rocket Project" in 1939.

=== Rocketry beginnings ===
In the early years of the project, work was primarily focused on the development of rocket technology. In 1941, Malina, Parsons, Forman, Martin Summerfield, and pilot Homer Bushey demonstrated the first jet-assisted takeoff (JATO) rockets to the Army. On March 19, 1942, von Kármán, Malina, Parsons, and Forman established the Aerojet Engineering Corporation to manufacture JATO rockets. The project took on the name Jet Propulsion Laboratory in November 1943. In the same year, Qian and two of his colleagues drafted the first document to use the name Jet Propulsion Laboratory.In February 1944, Caltech researchers signed a contract with Army Ordnance. They began developing guided missiles for Army Contractor's on July 1st, 1944.

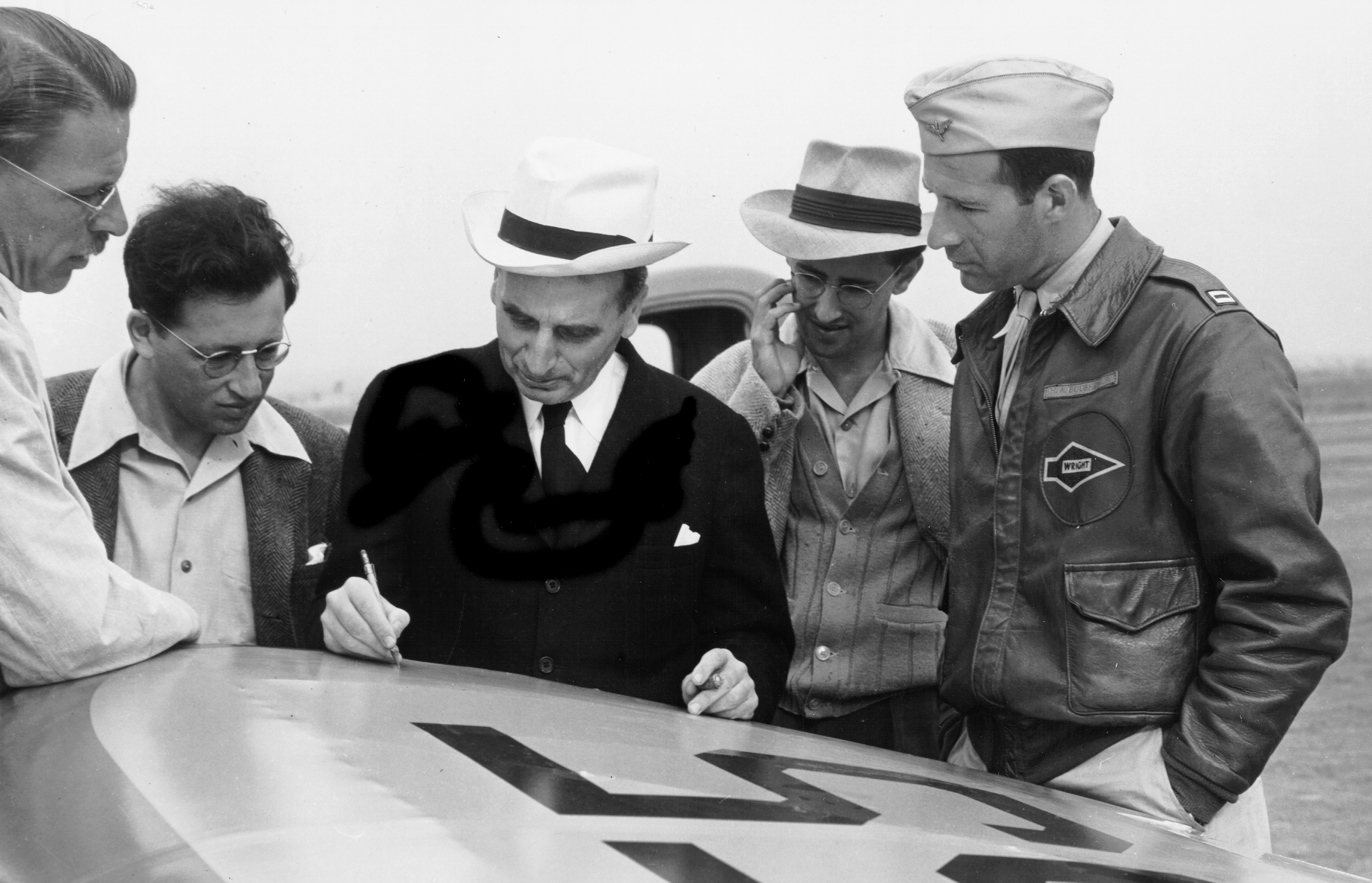
Theodore von Kármán sketching out a plan on the wing of an airplane. From left to right: Clark B. Millikan, Martin Summerfield, von Kármán, Frank J. Malina and pilot, Capt. Homer Boushey.

In a NASA conference on the history of early rocketry, Malina wrote that the work of the JPL was "considered to include" the research carried out by the GALCIT Rocket Research Group from 1936 on. In 1944, Parsons was expelled due to his "unorthodox and unsafe working methods" following one of several FBI investigations into his involvement with the occult, drugs and sexual promiscuity.

During JPL's Army years, the laboratory developed two significant deployed weapon systems, the MGM-5 Corporal and MGM-29 Sergeant tactical ballistic missiles, marking the first US ballistic missiles developed at JPL. It also developed several other weapons system prototypes, such as the Loki anti-aircraft missile system, and the forerunner of the Aerobee sounding rocket. At various times, it carried out rocket testing at the White Sands Proving Ground, Edwards Air Force Base, and Goldstone, California.

=== Transition to NASA ===
In 1954, JPL, under director William Pickering, teamed up with Wernher von Braun's engineers at the Army Ballistic Missile Agency's Redstone Arsenal in Huntsville, Alabama, to propose orbiting a satellite during the International Geophysical Year. The team lost that proposal to Project Vanguard, and instead embarked on a classified project to demonstrate ablative re-entry technology using a Jupiter-C rocket. They carried out three successful sub-orbital flights in 1956 and 1957. Using a spare Juno I (a modified Jupiter-C with a fourth stage), the two organizations then launched the United States' first satellite, Explorer 1, on January 31, 1958. This significant achievement marked a new era for JPL and the US in the space race.

Less than a year later in December 1958, JPL was transferred to the newly formed National Aeronautics and Space Administration (NASA). As a result of this transition, JPL became the agency's primary planetary spacecraft center, leading the design and operation of various lunar and interplanetary missions. The transfer to NASA marked the beginning of a "Golden Age" of planetary exploration for JPL in the 1960s and 1970s. JPL engineers designed and operated Ranger and Surveyor missions to the Moon that paved the way for the Apollo program. JPL proved itself a leader in interplanetary exploration with the Mariner missions to Venus, Mars, and Mercury, returning valuable data about our neighboring planets.

Notably, JPL was early to employ female mathematicians. In the 1940s and 1950s, using mechanical calculators, women in an all-female computations group performed trajectory calculations. In 1961, JPL hired Dana Ulery as the first female engineer to work alongside male engineers as part of the Ranger and Mariner mission tracking teams.

=== Deep space exploration ===
Building on the momentum from the successes of the 1960s and early 1970s, JPL initiated an era of deep space exploration in the late 1970s and 1980s. The highlight of this period was the launch of the twin Voyager spacecraft in 1977.

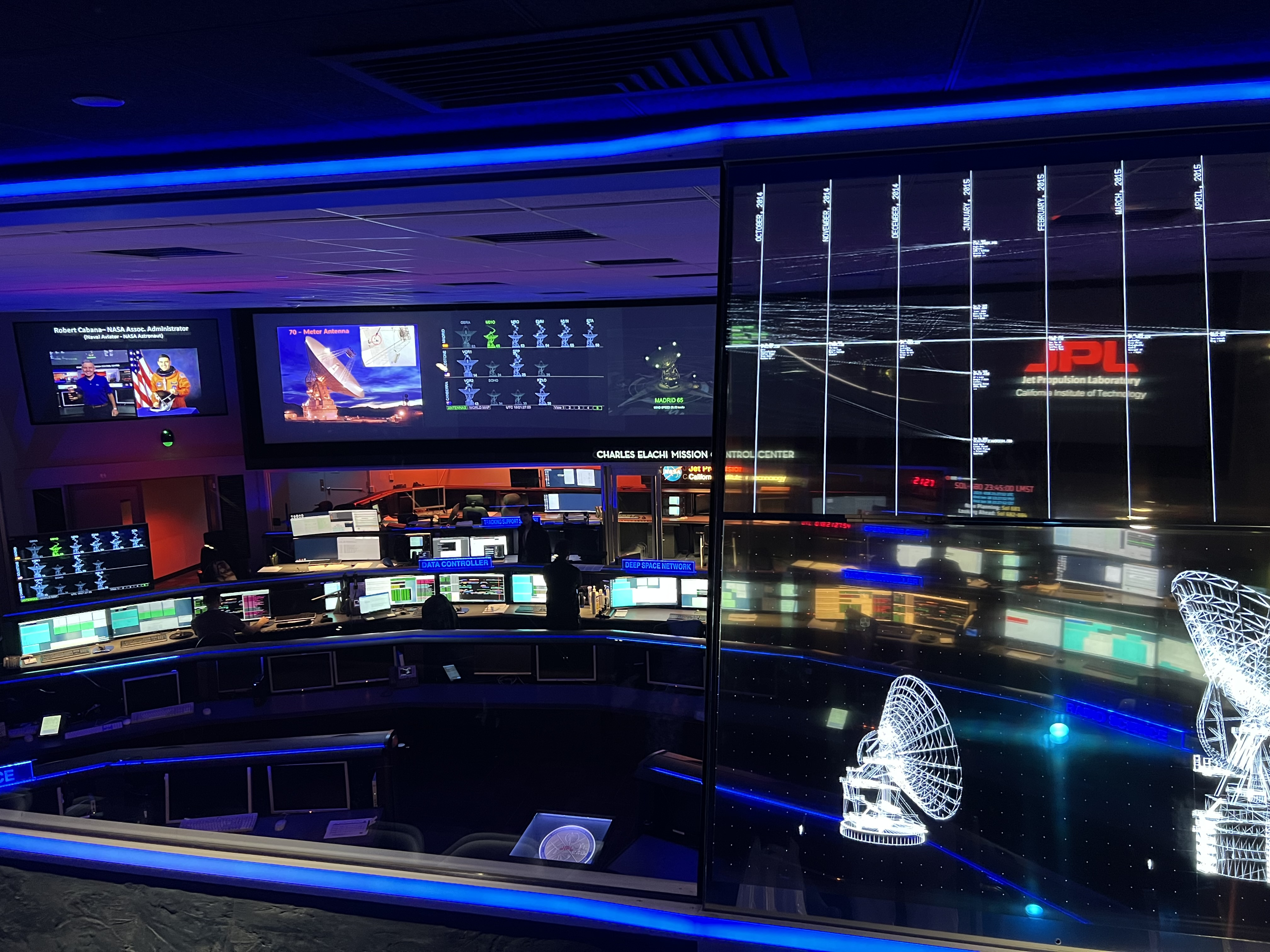
JPL Mission Control

Initially set on a trajectory to explore Jupiter and its moon Io, Voyager 1's mission parameters were adjusted to also provide a close flyby of Saturn's moon Titan. The spacecraft sent back detailed images and data from both gas giants, revolutionizing the understanding of these distant worlds. The Voyager 2 spacecraft followed a more extensive trajectory, conducting flybys of not just Jupiter and Saturn, but also Uranus and Neptune. These encounters provided firsthand data from all four gas giants, offering insights into the nature and dynamics of the outer planets. Both Voyager spacecraft, after fulfilling their primary mission objectives, were directed towards interstellar space, carrying with them the Golden Records – phonograph discs containing sounds and images selected to portray the diversity of life on Earth.

The 1980s also saw the inception of the Galileo mission which launched in the late 1980s. The Galileo spacecraft was designed to study Jupiter and its major moons in detail. Although the probe only entered the gas giant's orbit in the 1990s, its inception and planning during the 1980s signified JPL's continued commitment to deep space exploration.

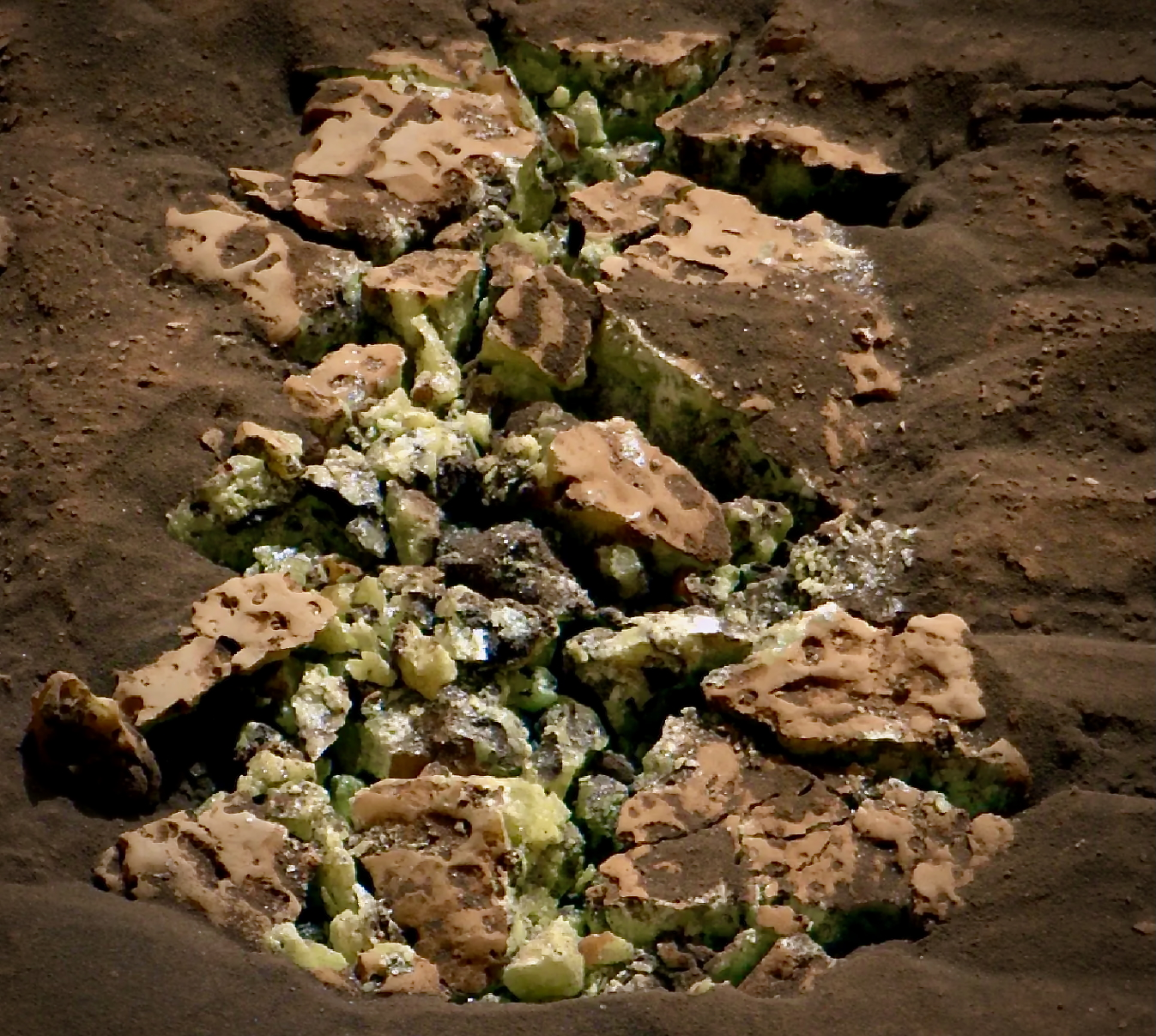
Native sulfur on Mars Discovered May 30, 2024, when the Curiosity rover drove over this outcrop and cracked it open.

=== "Faster, better, cheaper" era ===
In 1991, Edward C. Stone, the Voyager program scientist, was made the JPL director. His directorship was during the difficult period of the 90s: with the Cold War and the Space Race between the US and the USSR finished, NASA saw dwindling budgets and introduced the so-called "faster, better, cheaper" approach, that encouraged smaller, cheaper missions built with the help of third-party contractors, efficiently "commercializing" the research lab and forcing it to work with industry. Cost-cutting had to be done by Stone, who tried to adapt a new management culture at JPL, while at the same time trying not to hurt science. The plans were to downsize the lab and fire around 30% of JPL personnel by the end of the decade; Stone and Caltech leadership even feared that JPL could be closed.

JPL had little experience in small missions at the time: its "flagship" missions, like Voyager, Cassini, and Galileo, employed hundreds of people for decades. Cassini, for example, "directly supported maybe 500 work-years, about 10 percent of total lab staff [and] provided close to 20 percent of the lab budget". In order to comply with budget restrictions and save the mission, Cassini was downsized; to save $250 million, the scan platform had to be removed from the plans. Stone himself saw the "faster-better-cheaper" as a cultural change of the lab's engineering practices.

Stone also became a proponent of a management culture change at JPL, and installed Richard Laeser (former Voyager project manager) to apply total quality management (TQM) at all levels. Reorganization was required to meet NASA needs, and TQM "emphasized customer service", even though few people at JPL saw NASA as their customer. Many employees were against the new management practices; before TQM and the management changes, project managers at JPL were autonomous and even autocrative:

Project managers were often hard-driving autocrats; as Voyager manager Norm Haynes put it, they "were culled out to be sort of rugged individualists." The otherwise good-natured John Casani, the epitome of the breed, was also known as the "Ayatollah Casani". At one point a consultant gave a personality test to senior managers; at one end of the scale were the counselor types, such as the professorial Stone, and at the other were what Casani called the "leg breakers", including himself.

The most successful, "model" example of an FBC mission was the Mars Pathfinder lander and the first Mars rover, the Sojourner, developed by the JPL. The mission cost around 200 million dollars and was widely reported in the press, appearing on the covers of Time and Newsweek. Other missions were less fortunate: in 1998–1999, six missions were launched; four of them failed, including two Mars orbiters. Both JPL (Stone) and the NASA administration (Daniel Goldin) acknowledged that they pushed too far with the FBC; no project manager of the failed missions was fired.

According to Peter J. Westwick, as the director of JPL, Stone was a "cautious revolutionary". He retired in 2001; his successor, Charles Elachi, "felt no need to change JPL's culture".

=== Mars exploration ===
The 1990s and 2000s saw a resurgence in Mars exploration, driven by JPL's Mars Pathfinder and Mars Exploration Rover missions. In 1997, the Mars Pathfinder mission deployed the first successful Mars rover, Sojourner, demonstrating the feasibility of mobile exploration on the Martian surface. In 2004, the Mars Exploration Rovers, Spirit and Opportunity, landed on Mars. Opportunity outlived its expected lifespan by 14 years, providing a wealth of scientific data and setting the stage for future Mars missions.

=== Earth science and robotic exploration ===
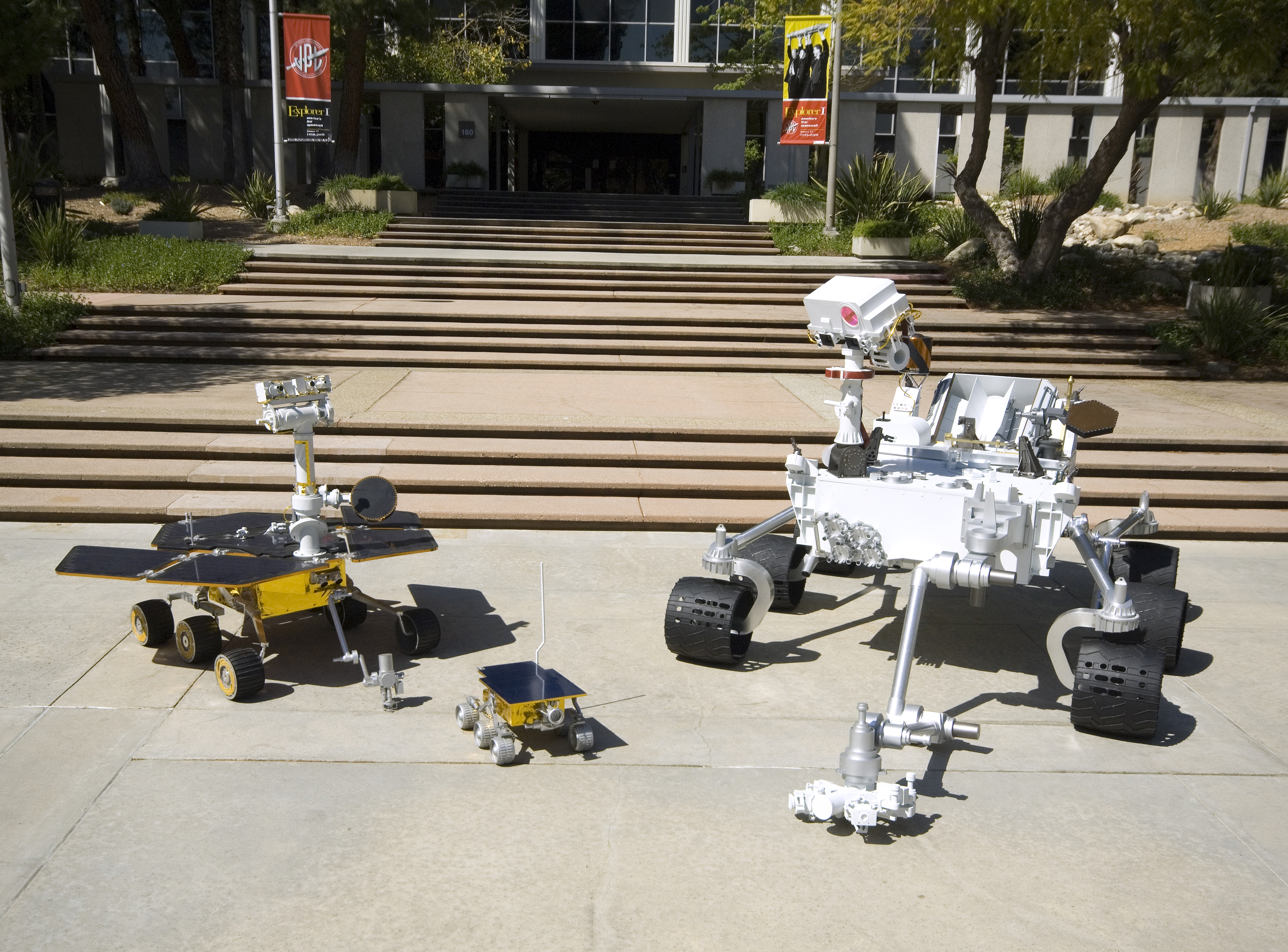
MSL mockup compared with the Mars Exploration Rover and Sojourner rover by the Jet Propulsion Laboratory on May 12, 2008

In the 2000s and 2010s, JPL broadened its exploration scope, including the launch of missions to study the outer planets, like the Juno mission to Jupiter and the Cassini-Huygens mission to Saturn. Concurrently, JPL also began to focus on Earth science missions, developing satellite technology to study climate change, weather patterns, and natural phenomena on Earth. JPL also opened the Near-Earth Object Program Office for NASA in 1998, which had found 95% of asteroids a kilometer or more in diameter that cross Earth's orbit by 2013.

Entering the 2010s and 2020s, JPL continued its Mars exploration with the Curiosity rover and the Mars 2020 mission, which included the Perseverance rover and the Ingenuity helicopter. Perseverance's core objective is to collect samples for a future Mars Sample Return (MSR) mission. In addition, JPL ventured into asteroid exploration with the OSIRIS-REx mission which returned a sample from asteroid Bennu.

=== 2020s and beyond ===
As JPL moves forward, its focus remains on diverse interplanetary and even interstellar missions. Future Mars missions will aim to return the samples collected by the Perseverance rover back to Earth. Additionally, JPL's Europa Clipper mission launched in 2024 to study Jupiter's moon Europa, believed to harbor a subsurface ocean. Building on the Voyager program's success, JPL continues to push the boundaries of deep-space exploration. The Interstellar probe concept, though not yet formalized, proposes to send a spacecraft ten times the distance from the Sun as Pluto, to explore the interstellar medium and the outermost reaches of the Solar System.

JPL has been recognized four times by the Space Foundation: with the Douglas S. Morrow Public Outreach Award, which is given annually to an individual or organization that has made significant contributions to public awareness of space programs, in 1998; and with the John L. "Jack" Swigert, Jr., Award for Space Exploration on three occasions – in 2009 (as part of NASA's Phoenix Mars Lander Team), 2006 and 2005.

In January 2025, JPL was closed and evacuated due to the Eaton Fire raging in the nearby towns of Pasadena and Altadena, with operations like the DSN getting relocated offsite. Although the facility has not sustained damage from the wildfires, it has experienced minor wind damage and as well as numerous employees losing their homes.

Caltech's contract to operate JPL runs through September 2028. In May 2026, NASA announced that it would open the contract to competitive bidding, allowing private companies, nonprofit organizations, and universities to submit proposals for the laboratory's management. NASA stated that the laboratory would continue operating as a federally funded research and development centers (FFRDC), and that the competition process would be conducted on a full and open basis. Caltech would remain eligible to bid for the contract. The arrangement would follow a model similar to that used by the Department of Energy for several of its FFRDCs.

== Location ==
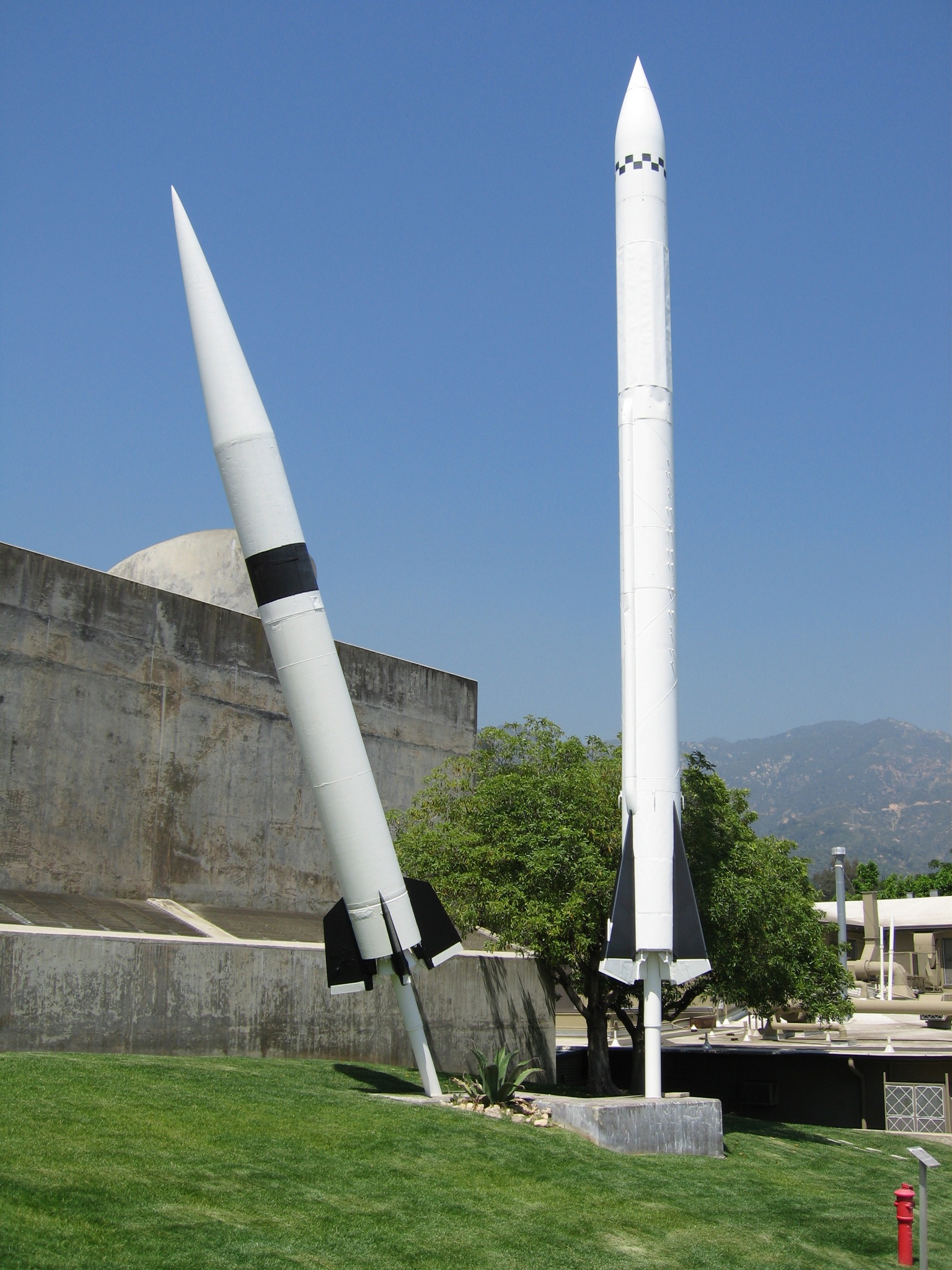
JPL-developed Sergeant (left) and Corporal (right) missiles on display at JPL in April 2006

When it was founded, JPL's site was immediately west of a rocky flood-plain – the Arroyo Seco riverbed – above the Devil's Gate dam in the northwestern panhandle of the city of Pasadena in Southern California, near Los Angeles. While the first few buildings were constructed in land bought from the city of Pasadena, subsequent buildings were constructed in neighboring unincorporated land that later became part of La Cañada Flintridge. Nowadays, most of the 168 acres (68 ha) of the U.S. federal government-owned NASA property that makes up the JPL campus is located in La Cañada Flintridge. Despite this, JPL still uses a Pasadena address (4800 Oak Grove Drive, Pasadena, CA 91109) as its official mailing address. There has been occasional rivalry between the two cities over the issue of which one should be mentioned in the media as the home of the laboratory.

== Employees ==
Following multiple rounds of workforce reductions in 2024, 2025 and 2026 the Jet Propulsion Laboratory (JPL) maintains a staff of approximately 5,000 regular employees. While operated by Caltech, the facility hosts the NASA Office of JPL Management and Oversight (NOJMO), which consists of federal managers who provide on-site contract oversight and regulatory compliance. The laboratory's workforce is supplemented by Caltech graduate students as well as undergraduate interns and co-op students. In early 2025, in accordance with federal executive orders, JPL began dissolving its Diversity, Equity, and Inclusion (DEI) programs, leading to the removal of its Chief Diversity Leader in April 2025.

== Education ==
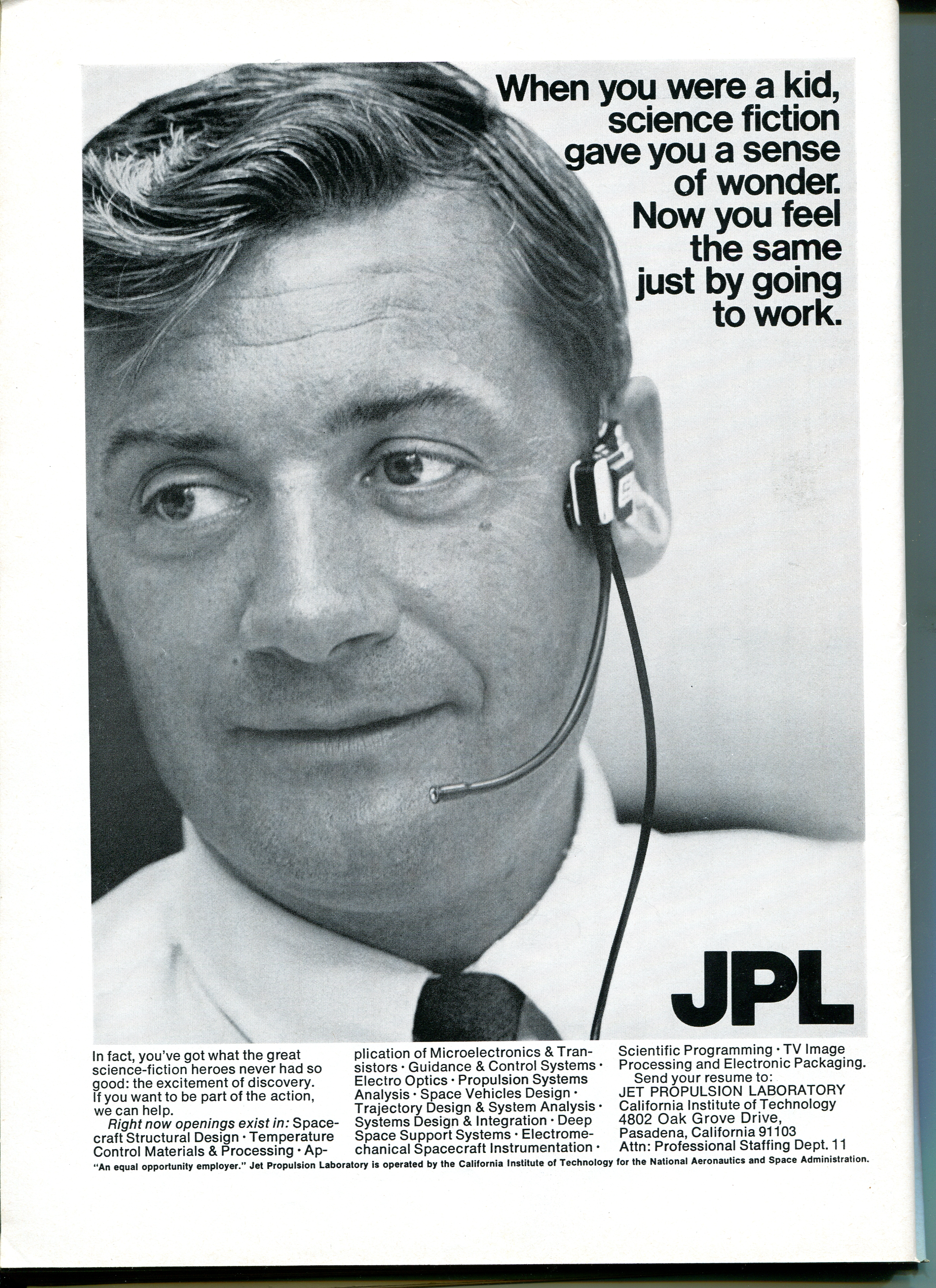
A 1960s advert reads: "When you were a kid, science fiction gave you a sense of wonder. Now you feel the same just by going to work."

The JPL Education Office serves educators and students by providing them with activities, resources, materials and opportunities tied to NASA missions and science. The mission of its programs is to introduce and further students' interest in pursuing STEM (science, technology, engineering and mathematics) careers.

=== Internships and fellowships ===
JPL offers research, internship and fellowship opportunities in the summer and throughout the year to high school through postdoctoral and faculty students. (In most cases, students must be U.S. citizens or legal permanent residents to apply, although foreign nationals studying at U.S. universities are eligible for limited programs.) Interns are sponsored through NASA programs, university partnerships and JPL mentors for research opportunities at the laboratory in areas including technology, robotics, planetary science, aerospace engineering, and astrophysics.

In August 2013, JPL was named one of "The 10 Most Awesome College Labs of 2013" by Popular Science, which noted that about 100 students who intern at the laboratory are considered for permanent jobs at JPL after they graduate.

The JPL Education Office also hosts the Planetary Science Summer School (PSSS), an annual week-long workshop for graduate and postdoctoral students. The program involves a one-week team design exercise developing an early mission concept study, working with JPL's Advanced Projects Design Team ("Team X") and other concurrent engineering teams.

=== Museum & Informal Education Alliance Alliance ===
JPL created the NASA Museum Alliance in 2003 out of a desire to provide museums, planetariums, visitor centers and other kinds of informal educators with exhibit materials, professional development and information related to the then-upcoming landings of the Mars rovers Spirit and Opportunity. The Alliance now has more than 500 members, who get access to NASA displays, models, educational workshops and networking opportunities through the program. Staff at educational organizations that meet the Museum Alliance requirements can register to participate online.

The Museum Alliance is a subset of the JPL Education Office's Informal Education group, which also serves after-school and summer programs, parents and other kinds of informal educators.

On December 9, 2020, the Museum Alliance officially announced a rebrand to the Museum & Informal Education (MIE) Alliance. In an announcement to members, they said, "Pronounced 'My' Alliance, our new name better reflects the diversity of organizations you represent."

=== Educator Resource Center ===
The NASA/JPL Educator Resource Center, which is moving from its location at the Indian Hill Mall in Pomona, California, at the end of 2013, offers resources, materials and free workshops for formal and informal educators covering science, technology, engineering and science topics related to NASA missions and science.

== Keck Institute for Space Studies ==
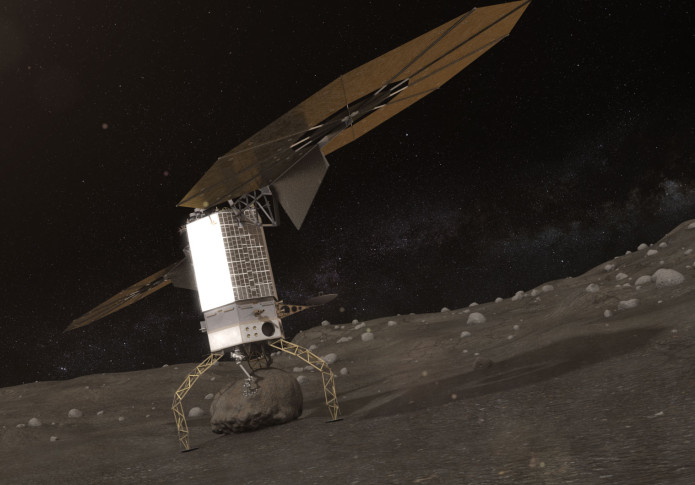
Asteroid capture gripper to grasp and secure a boulder from an asteroid. Conceptual design, 2015

In 2008, Caltech and JPL jointly established the Keck Institute for Space Studies (KISS), an interdisciplinary think tank designed to foster early-stage innovation in space science and engineering. Based at Caltech, KISS organizes intensive study programs that bring together researchers from JPL, Caltech, and experts in specialized fields from a range of institutes to explore and implement mission concepts and technologies for space exploration and technology. Centered on the research and instrumentation strengths of Caltech and JPL, KISS convenes experts from academia, government, and industry to develop new mission concepts in planetary science, Earth science, and astrophysics. The institute also engages graduate students and postdoctoral researchers in its studies and promotes public outreach through lectures and online dissemination. While KISS does not directly manage space missions, several of its studies have seeded proposals that evolved into JPL-led projects for NASA.

Some of the JPL missions influenced by KISS include:

- Asteroid Redirect Mission – Conceptualized in a 2011 KISS-led study on asteroid retrieval, the idea evolved into NASA's Asteroid Redirect Robotic Mission.
- InSight Mars Lander – A KISS planetary seismology workshop in 2010 directly influenced the mission's payload and design.
- Geochronology on Mars (Curiosity) – Techniques for dating Martian rocks, proposed during a 2009 KISS study, were implemented on Curiosity.
- SPHEREx and Lunar Trailblazer – Both missions, selected in 2019, feature PIs affiliated with Caltech/KISS (Bethany Ehlmann and Jamie Bock) and deploy designs rooted in KISS-conceived concepts.

== Open house ==
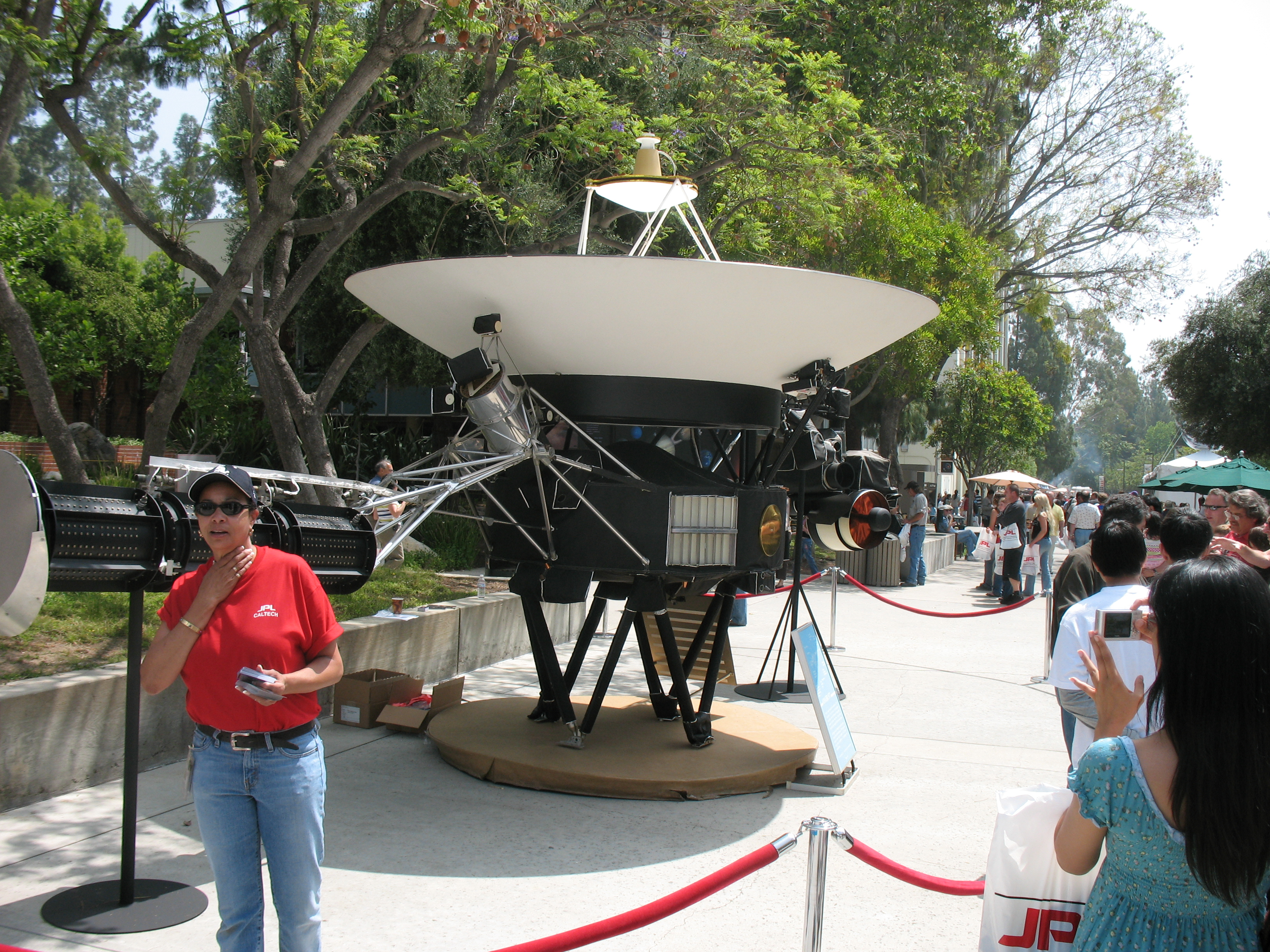
A display at the May 19, 2007, Open House

The lab had an open house once a year on a Saturday and Sunday in May or June, when the public was invited to tour the facilities and see live demonstrations of JPL science and technology. More limited private tours are also available throughout the year if scheduled well in advance. Thousands of schoolchildren from Southern California and elsewhere visit the lab every year. Due to federal spending cuts mandated by budget sequestration, the open house has been previously cancelled. JPL open house for 2014 was October 11 and 12 and 2015 was October 10 and 11. Starting from 2016, JPL replaced the annual Open House with "Ticket to Explore JPL", which features the same exhibits but requires tickets and advance reservation. Roboticist and Mars rover driver Vandi Verma frequently acts as science communicator at open house type events to encourage children (and particularly girls) into STEM careers.

== Other works ==
In addition to its government work, JPL has also assisted the nearby motion picture and television industries, by advising them about scientific accuracy in their productions. Science fiction shows advised by JPL include Babylon 5 and its sequel series, Crusade.

JPL also works with the Department of Homeland Security Science and Technology Directorate (DHS-S&T). JPL and DHS-S&T developed a search and rescue tool for first responders called FINDER. First responders can use FINDER to locate people still alive who are buried in rubble after a disaster or terrorist attack. FINDER uses microwave radar to detect breathing and pulses.

Additionally, JPL is home to the JPL-RPIF (Jet Propulsion Laboratory – Regional Planetary Image Facility) which is chartered as a repository for all robotic spacecraft hard-copy data and thus provides a valuable resource to NASA funded science investigators, and an important conduit for the distribution of NASA generated materials to local educators in the Los Angeles/southern California area.

== Funding ==
The predominant source of JPL's financial support is NASA. As a field center of NASA, JPL's primary activities and projects are generally aligned with NASA's mission objectives in space exploration, Earth sciences, and astrophysics. The funding allocated to JPL comes as a portion of NASA's annual budget, which is itself part of the United States federal budget approved by Congress. The scale of the budget is contingent on the projects that JPL undertakes as missions can range from flagship interplanetary missions costing billions of U.S. dollars to smaller Earth observation systems with budgets in the hundreds of millions.

Aside from NASA, JPL secures funding for specialized projects from other federal agencies, including but not limited to the National Oceanic and Atmospheric Administration (NOAA) the United States Geological Survey (USGS), and the U.S. Department of Defense (DoD). Occasionally, JPL engages in joint missions or research endeavors with international space agencies or research institutions. While these partnerships contribute a relatively small portion of JPL's overall budget, they serve to enhance the scope and impact of its scientific research and technological development.

The total budget for JPL is subject to annual fluctuations based on both the federal allocation to NASA and the life cycle of ongoing projects. High-profile missions may receive significant long-term funding commitments, whereas smaller or shorter-term projects may have more modest financial support. These agencies often commission projects that leverage JPL's unique expertise in areas like remote sensing, robotics, and systems engineering. Although these projects form a smaller part of JPL's overall budget, they are integral to fulfilling the diverse set of objectives that these federal agencies oversee.

In fiscal year 2022, the laboratory's budget was approximately $2.4 billion, with the largest share going to Planetary Science development.

In February and November 2024, due to the overall budget situation and budget shifts in Mars Sample Return (MSR), the institute laid off approximately 1000 employees and contractors.

== Peanuts tradition ==
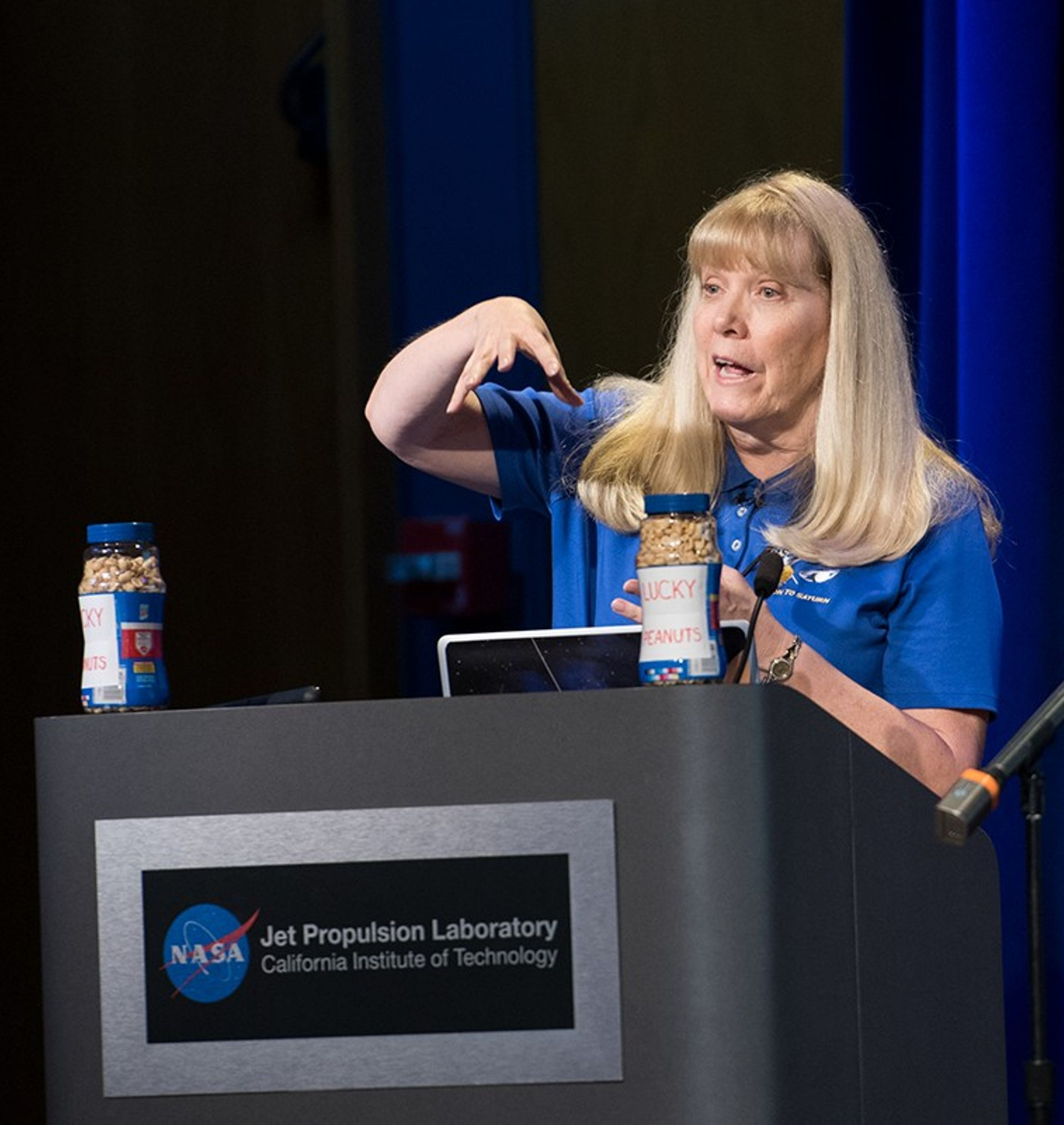
Linda Spilker explains the tradition of lucky peanuts at a gathering for Cassini mission team members, family and friends in Von Karman Auditorium at JPL, 2017

There is a tradition at JPL to eat "lucky peanuts" before critical mission events, such as launches, orbital insertions, or landings. As the story goes, after the Ranger program had experienced failure after failure during the 1960s, the first successful Ranger mission to impact the Moon occurred after either the Ranger 7 project manager, Harris "Bud" Schurmeier, or the mission trajectory engineer, Dick Wallace, had decided to pass out peanuts to relieve tension. The staff jokingly decided that the peanuts must have been a good luck charm, and the tradition persisted.

== Missions ==
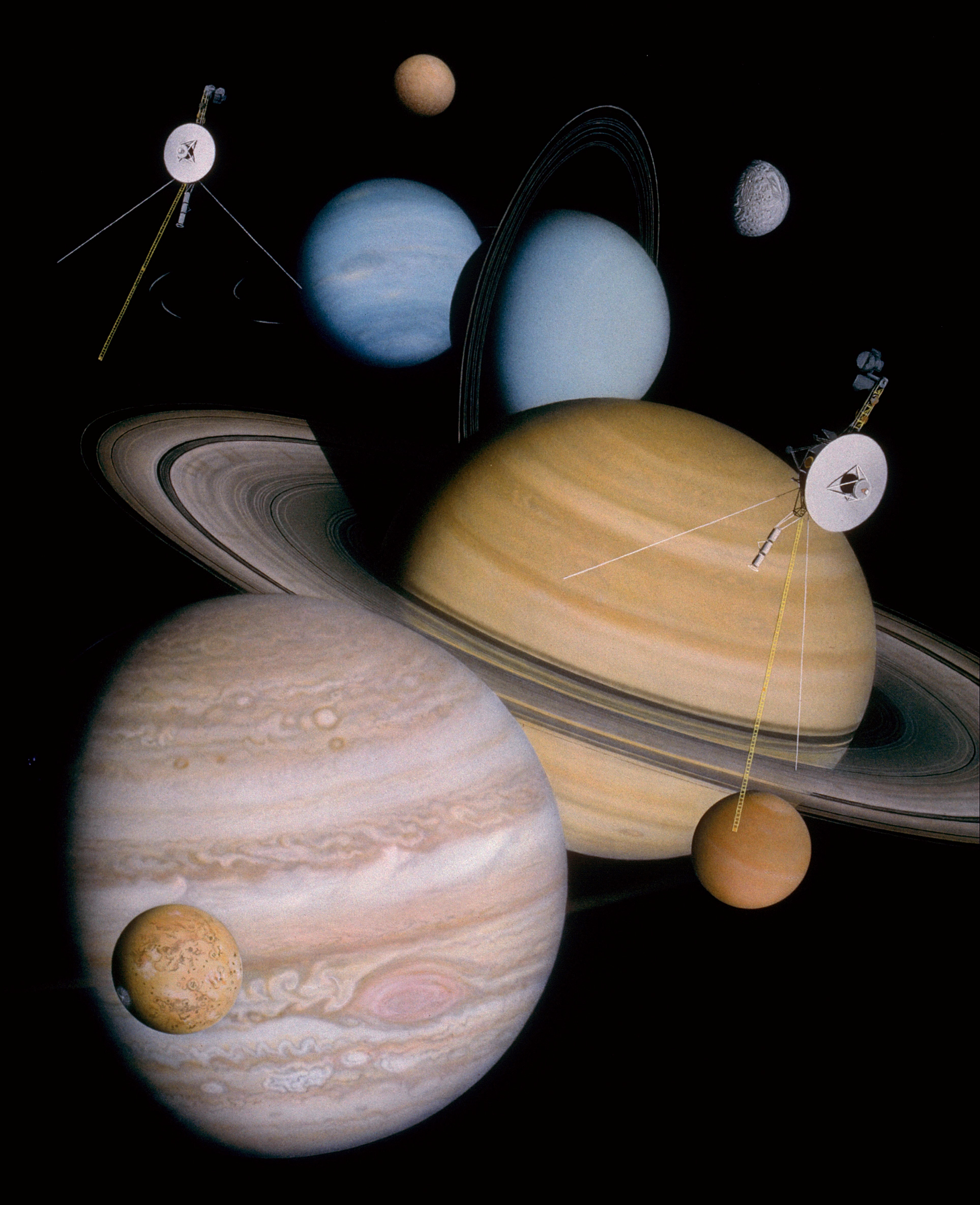
A poster of the planets and moons visited during the Voyager program

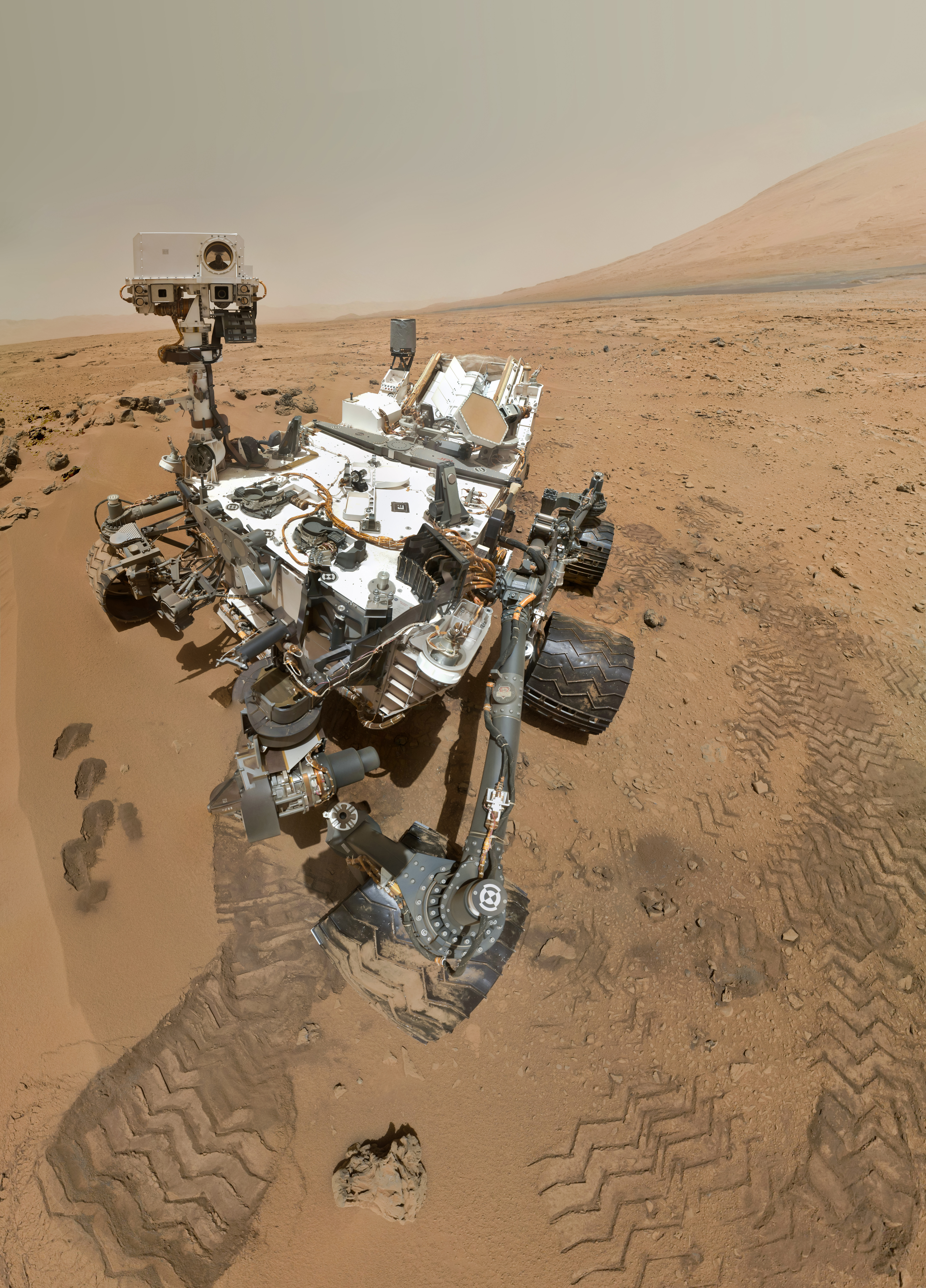
Curiosity rover self-portrait in Gale Crater, 2012

These are some of the missions partially sponsored by JPL:

- ASTERIA
- Cassini–Huygens
- CloudSat
- Deep Space 1 and 2
- Europa Clipper
- Explorer program
- Galileo
- Gravity Recovery and Climate Experiment (GRACE)
- InSight
- Juno
- Magellan
- Mariner program
- Mars 2020
- Mars Climate Orbiter
- Mars Cube One
- Mars Exploration Rover Mission
- Mars Global Surveyor
- Mars Odyssey
- Mars Pathfinder
- Mars Reconnaissance Orbiter
- Mars Science Laboratory
- NISAR
- Ocean Surface Topography Mission (OSTM/Jason-2)
- Orbiting Carbon Observatory
- Phoenix
- Pioneer 3 and 4
- Psyche
- Ranger program
- Shuttle Radar Topography Mission
- Soil Moisture Active Passive (SMAP)
- Spitzer Space Telescope
- Stardust
- Surveyor program
- SWOT
- Venus Synthetic Aperture Radar
- VERITAS
- Viking program
- Voyager program (Voyager 1 and Voyager 2)
- Wide Field and Planetary Camera 2
- Wide-field Infrared Survey Explorer

== List of directors ==
All of the lab directors hold doctorates in engineering, physics, geology, geochemistry or planetary science. Acting/interim directors tend to be retired military officers with a strong science and organizational background.

No.	Image	Director	Term start	Term end	Refs.
1		Theodore von Kármán	1938	1944	
2		Frank Malina	1944	1946	
acting		Louis Dunn	1946	1947	
3		Louis Dunn	1947	August 31, 1954	
4		William Hayward Pickering	September 1, 1954	March 31, 1976	
5		Bruce C. Murray	April 1, 1976	June 30, 1982	
Acting		Charles Terhune Jr.	July 1, 1982	October 1982	
6		Lew Allen, Jr.	October 1982	December 31, 1990	
7		Edward C. Stone	January 1, 1991	April 30, 2001	
8		Charles Elachi	May 1, 2001	June 30, 2016	
9		Michael M. Watkins	July 1, 2016	August 20, 2021	
interim		Larry D. James	August 21, 2021	May 15, 2022	
10		Laurie Leshin	May 16, 2022	May 31, 2025	
11		Dave Gallagher	June 1, 2025	present	

== Team X ==
The JPL Advanced Projects Design Team, also known as Team X, is an interdisciplinary team of engineers that utilizes "concurrent engineering methodologies to complete rapid design, analysis and evaluation of mission concept designs".

== Controversies ==
=== Employee background check lawsuit ===
On February 25, 2005, Homeland Security Presidential Directive 12 was approved by the Secretary of Commerce. This was followed by Federal Information Processing Standards 201 (FIPS 201), which specified how the federal government should implement personal identity verification. These specifications led to a need for rebadging to meet the updated requirements.

On August 30, 2007, a group of JPL employees filed suit in federal court against NASA, Caltech, and the Department of Commerce, claiming their constitutional rights were being violated by the new, overly invasive background investigations. 97% of JPL employees were classified at the low-risk level and would be subjected to the same clearance procedures as those obtaining moderate/high risk clearance. Under HSPD 12 and FIPS 201, investigators have the right to obtain any information on employees, which includes questioning acquaintances on the status of the employee's mental, emotional, and financial stability. Additionally, if employees depart JPL before the end of the two-year validity of the background check, no investigation ability is terminated; former employees can still be legally monitored.

Employees were told that if they did not sign an unlimited waiver of privacy, they would be deemed to have "voluntarily resigned". The United States Court of Appeals for the Ninth Circuit found the process violated the employees' privacy rights and issued a preliminary injunction. NASA appealed and the US Supreme Court granted certiorari on March 8, 2010. On January 19, 2011, the Supreme Court overturned the Ninth Circuit decision, ruling that the background checks did not violate any constitutional privacy right that the employees may have had.

=== Coppedge v Jet Propulsion Laboratory ===
On March 12, 2012, the Los Angeles Superior Court took opening statements on the case in which former JPL employee David Coppedge brought suit against the lab due to workplace discrimination and wrongful termination. In the suit, Coppedge alleges that he first lost his "team lead" status on JPL's Cassini-Huygens mission in 2009 and then was fired in 2011 because of his evangelical Christian beliefs and specifically his belief in intelligent design. Conversely, JPL, through the Caltech lawyers representing the laboratory, allege that Coppedge's termination was simply due to budget cuts and his demotion from team lead was because of harassment complaints and from on-going conflicts with his co-workers. Superior Court Judge Ernest Hiroshige issued a final ruling in favor of JPL on January 16, 2013.

== Gallery ==
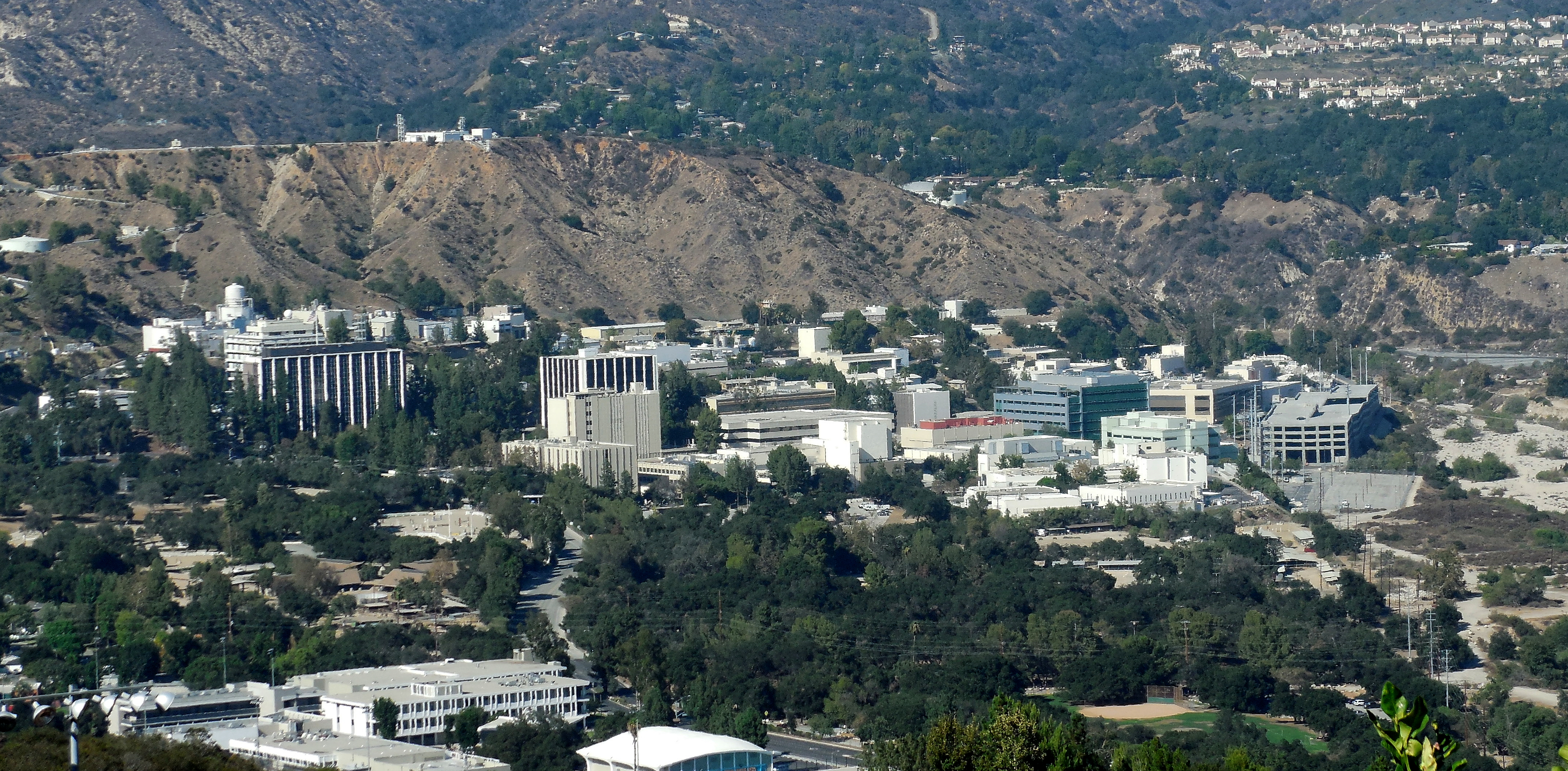
A 2015 photo of JPL from above

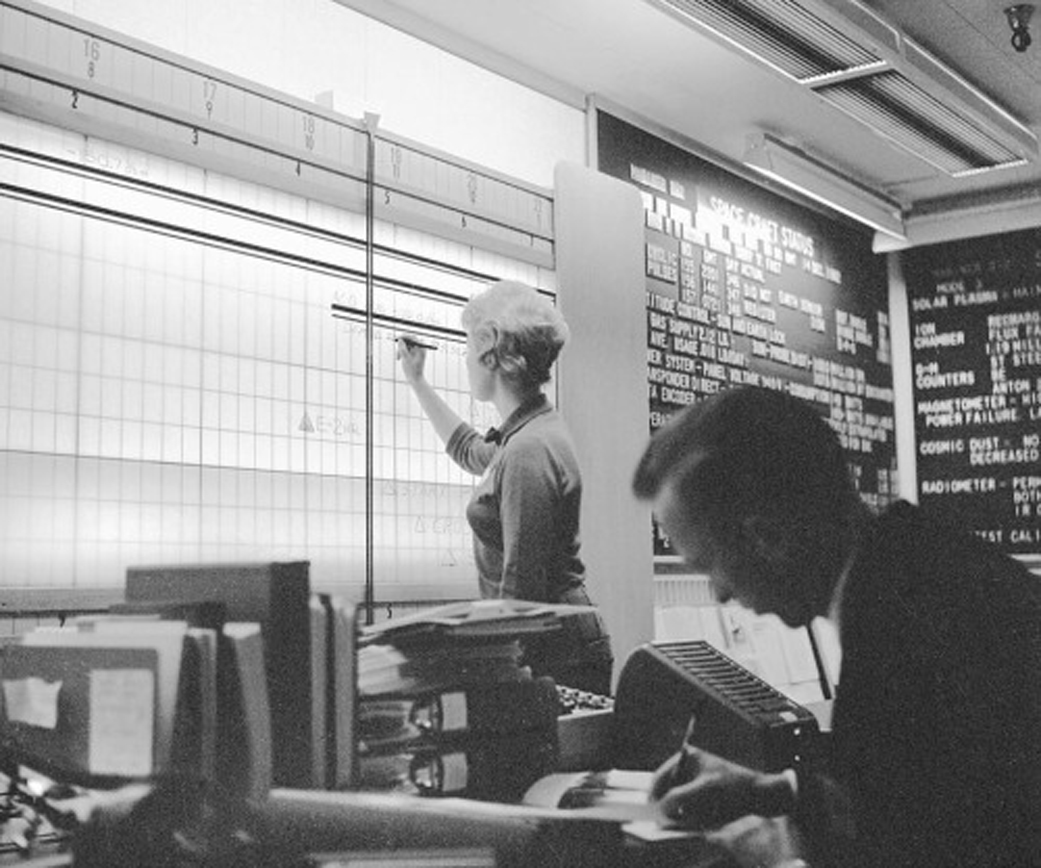
Human computers in the control room at JPL tracking Mariner 2

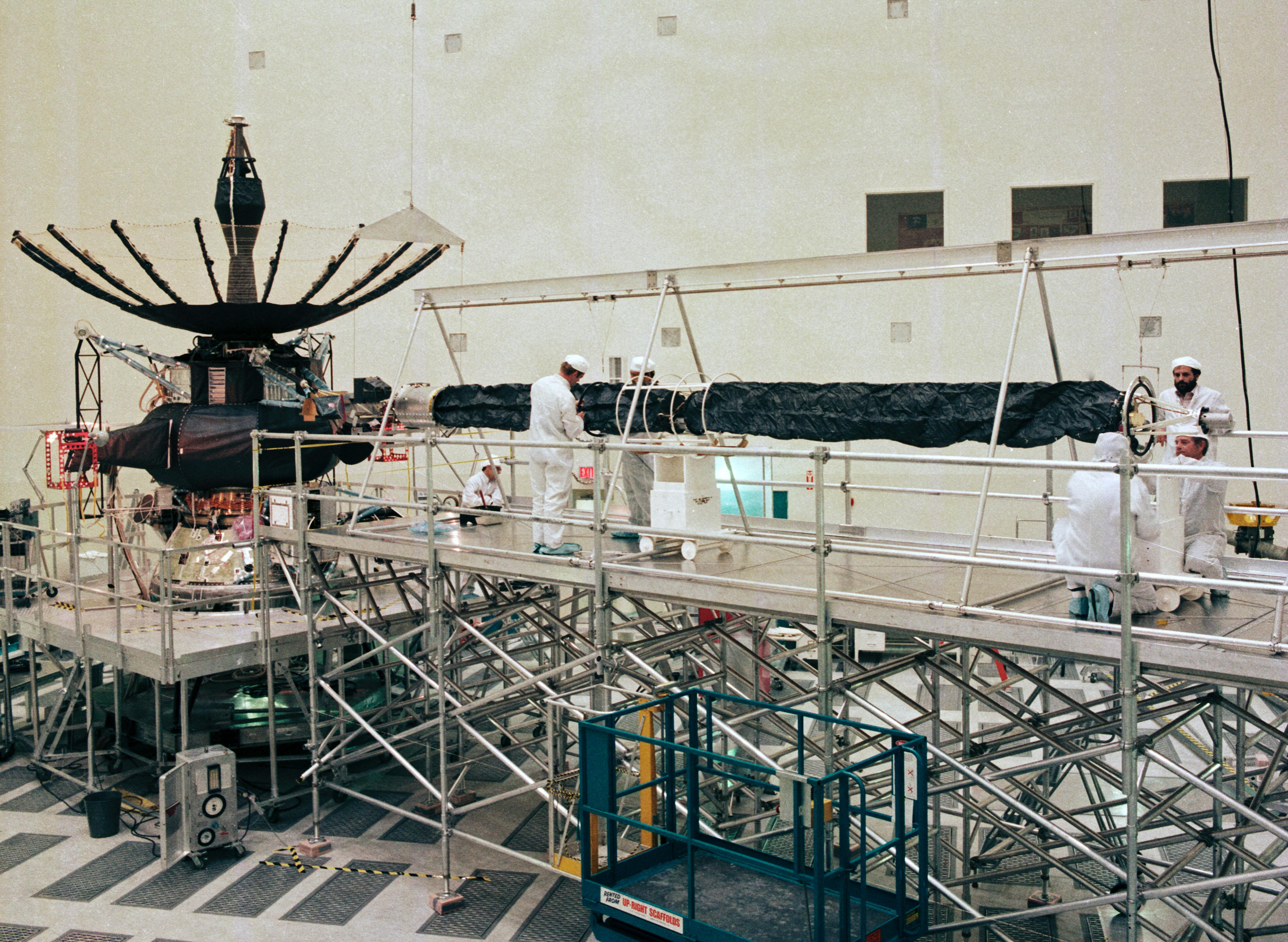
Galileo spacecraft in JPL's High Bay

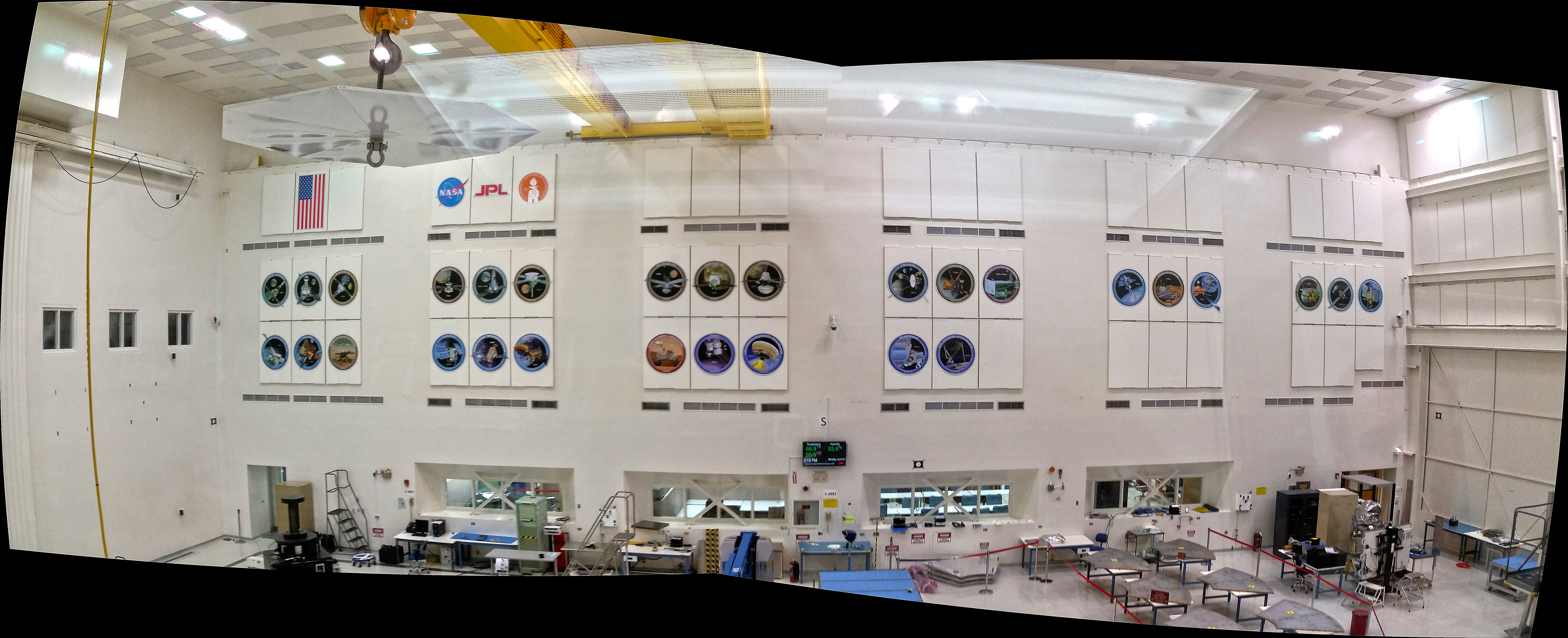
Spacecraft assembly room at JPL

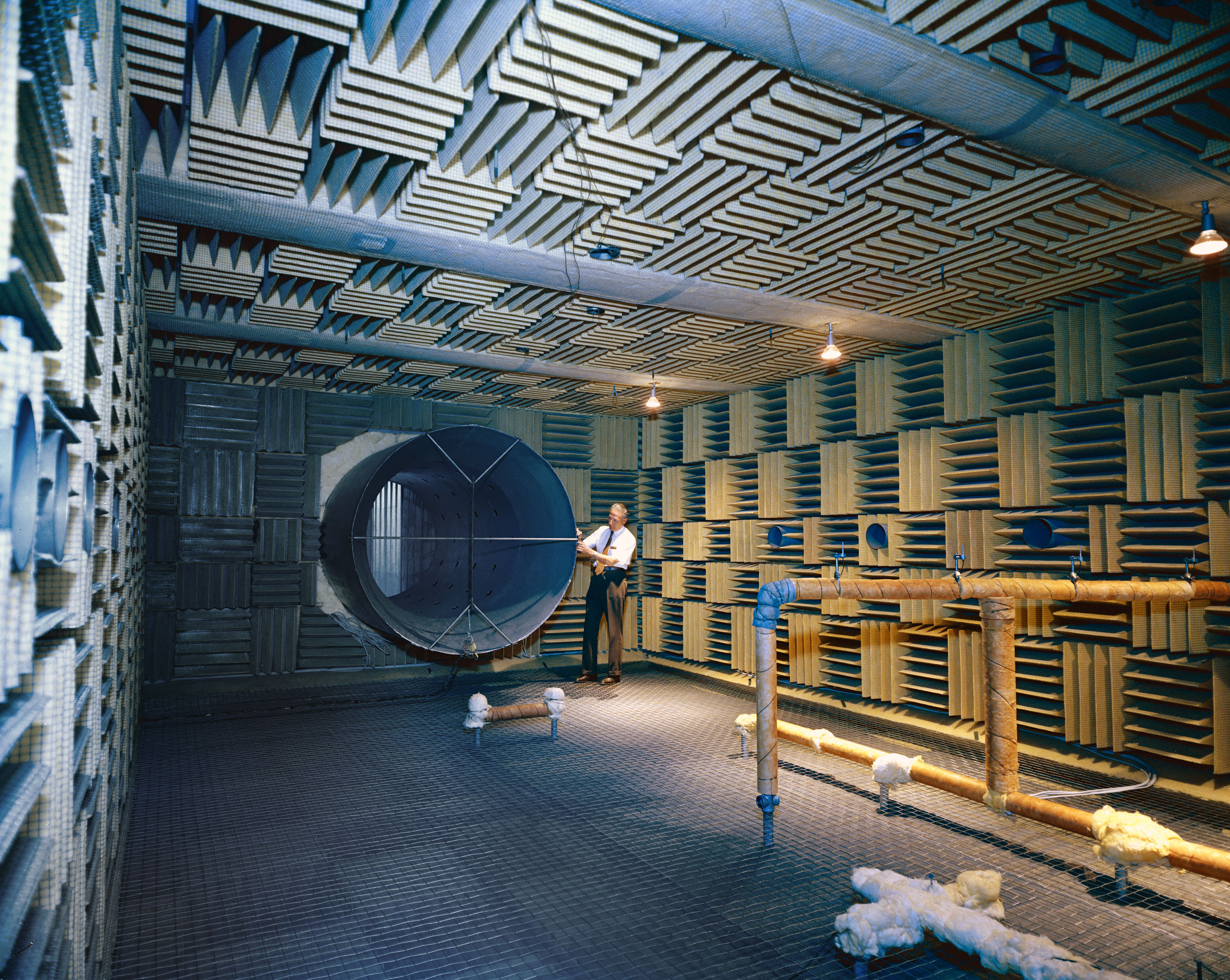
Aerodynamic noise facility at JPL (c. 1970)

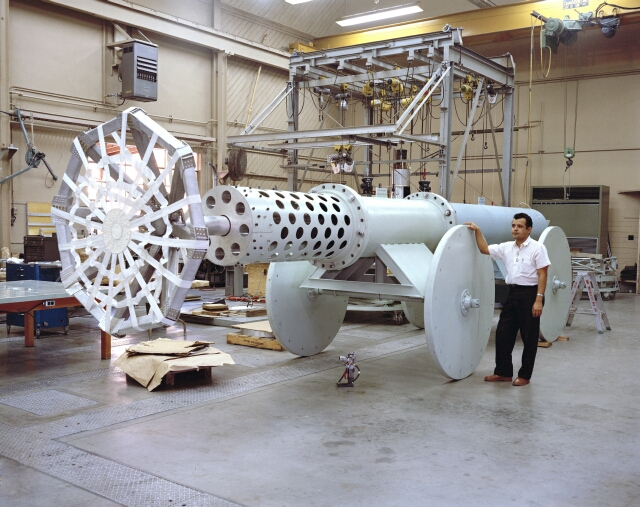
Pneumatic cannon in JPL's impact testing facility

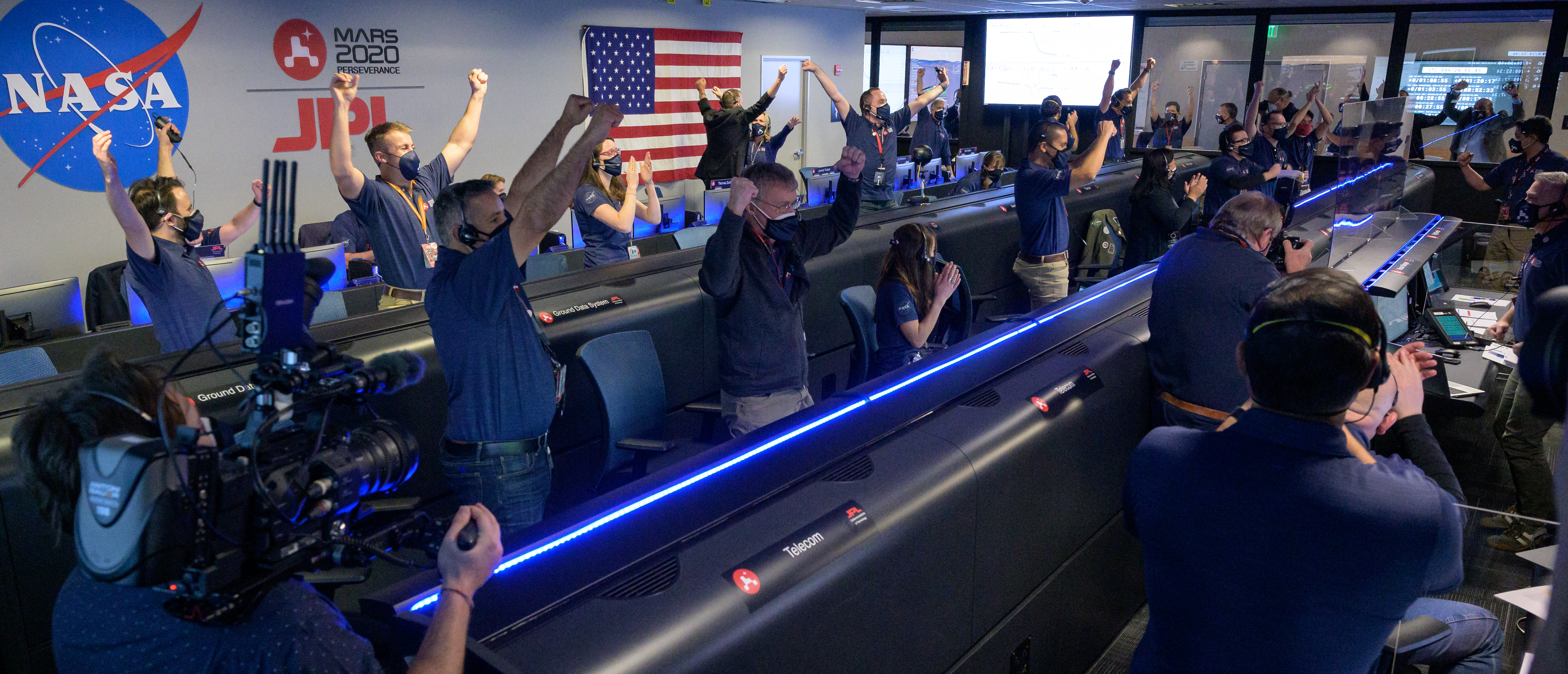
JPL employees celebrate the landing of the Perseverance rover in JPL's mission control.

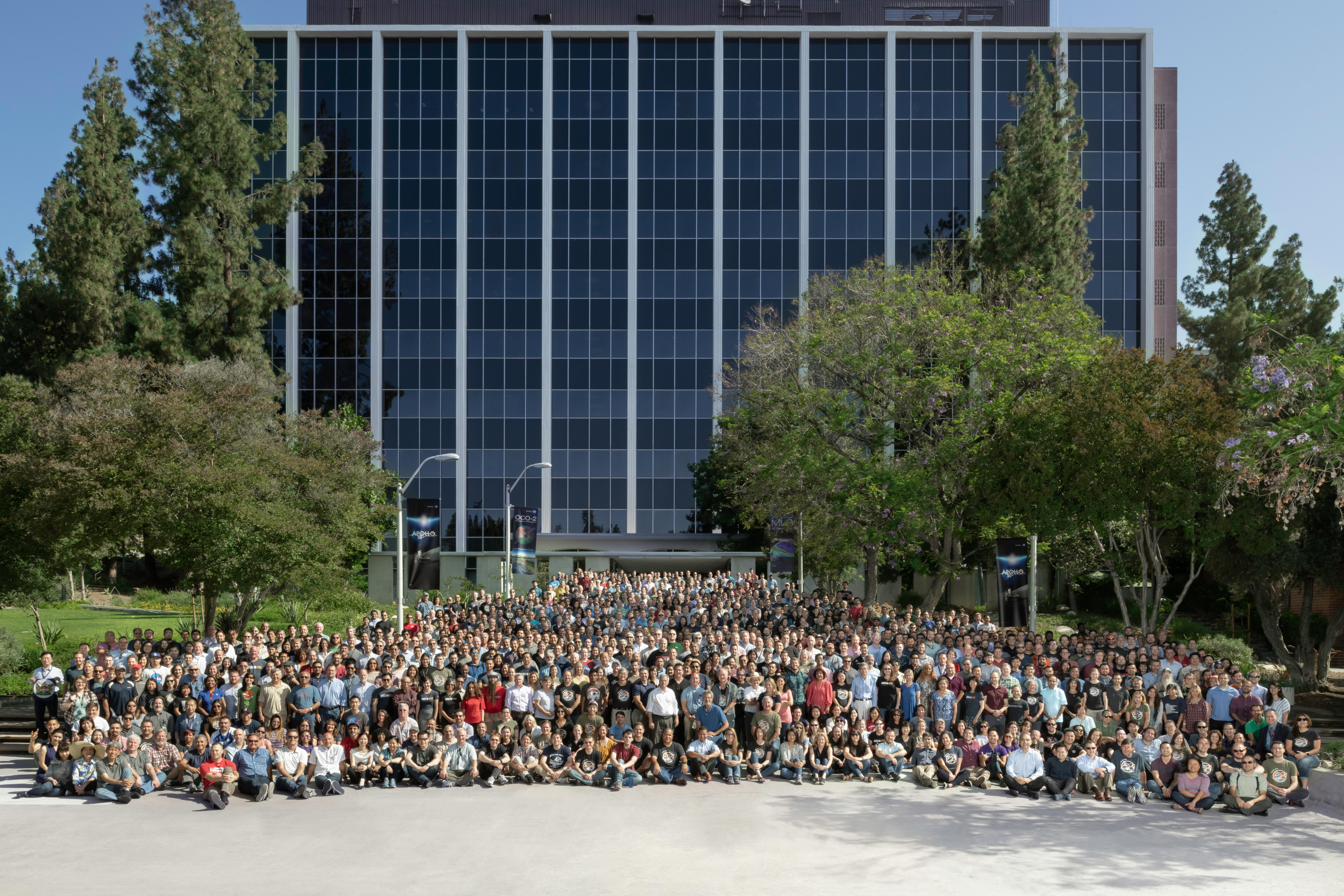
Mars Perseverance rover team in front of JPL's administration building
