= Twenty-Five-Foot Space Simulator =

- U.S. National Register of Historic Places
- U.S. National Historic Landmark
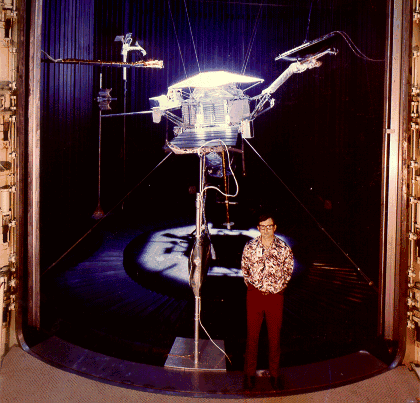
- Mariner 10 in the Twenty-Five-Foot Space Simulator

- Location within the Los Angeles metropolitan area Location within California Location within the United States
- Location: Jet Propulsion Laboratory, Pasadena, California
- Coordinates: 34°12′9.8″N 118°10′22.4″W
- Area: less than one acre
- Built: 1961
- Architect: NASA
- NRHP reference No.: 85002812

Significant dates
- Added to NRHP: October 3, 1985
- Designated NHL: October 3, 1985

The Twenty-Five-Foot Space Simulator is a chamber for testing spacecraft in space-like conditions, including extreme cold, high radiation, and near-vacuum pressure. Built in 1961, it is located at the Jet Propulsion Laboratory in Pasadena, California. It has been used to prepare many American space probes for their launches, including the Ranger, Surveyor, Mariner, and Voyager spacecraft. Ingenuity, the first helicopter to fly on Mars (2021-2024), was tested here. The Twenty-Five-Foot Space Simulator has a 25-foot inside diameter and stands 85 feet tall.

The first facility of its type, the chamber served as an example for other countries seeking to establish space programs. It was declared a National Historic Landmark in 1985 and is on the National Register of Historic Places.

== Description ==
The Twenty-Five-Foot Space Simulator is a stainless-steel cylinder 85 feet (26 m) in height and 27 feet (8.2 m) in diameter. A doorway 15 feet (4.6 m) wide and 25 feet (7.6 m) high provides access for bringing test objects and equipment into the chamber; a personnel access door is built into the larger doorway. Its walls and floor are lined with cooling shrouds that help provide a controllable temperature range from −320 °F (−195.6 °C) to 200 °F (93 °C). A series of lamps, lenses, and mirrors can irradiate the chamber with a directed beam of simulated solar energy in a variety of patterns and strengths. The chamber can be depressurized to 5×10^{−7} torr (6.7×10^{−5} Pa). Test objects can be mounted with a number of attachment points and methods. The chamber is mounted on a seismically isolated foundation. The chamber requires about 75 minutes to achieve a space-like environment, and about 2 1/2 hours to return to a normal environment.

Next to the chamber is a clean room in which equipment can be prepared for testing.

== See also ==
- List of National Historic Landmarks in California
- Space Environment Simulation Laboratory, built in 1965 at the Johnson Space Center in Texas
