= Mutallab =

Mutallab is a surname. Notable people with the surname include:

- Umaru Mutallab (born 1939), Nigerian businessman, banker, and government minister
- Umar Farouk Abdul Mutallab (born 1986), the "Underwear Bomber", a Nigerian convicted terrorist
