= Umaru Mutallab =

Nigerian businessman and financier (born 1939)

Alhaji Umaru Mutallab
- Born: 15 December 1939 (age 86); Katsina, Northern Region, British Nigeria
- Education: Barewa College; Achimota College; South West London College
- Occupation: Banker
- Political party: National Party of Nigeria
- Board member of: Chairman of Jaiz Bank; First Bank of Nigeria; NEPA; Nigeria Agip Oil
- Children: Umar Farouk Abdulmutallab
- Awards: Nigerian Commander of the Order of the Niger; Italian Commander of the Order of Merit

Alhaji Umaru Abdul Mutallab (born 15 December 1939) is a Nigerian businessman and financier, who served under the military government of General Murtala Mohammed and Olusegun Obasanjo.

Mutallab was described by The New York Times as "among Nigeria's richest and most prominent men", by The Telegraph as being "one of Nigeria's most prominent bankers", and by The Guardian as being "one of the country's most respected businessmen".

His son, Umar Farouk Abdulmutallab (the Christmas bomber) attempted to detonate plastic explosives aboard Northwest Airlines Flight 253 on 25 December 2009 and is currently serving four life term sentences plus 50 years without parole at ADX Florence, a supermax federal prison in the United States.

== Biography ==
Mutallab was born to the family of Abdul Mutallab Barade, an officer in the Funtua Works Dept. He lives in Funtua, in Katsina State in Northern Nigeria, though reportedly the family owns homes in London and Ghana as well. The family owns at least three homes in Nigeria (in Abuja, Funtua, and Kaduna).

=== Education ===
He attended Barewa College, Zaria, Achimota College, Accra, Ghana, and the South West London College, London. He was awarded an honorary doctoral degree by the Obafemi Awolowo University, Ile-Ife.

=== Career ===
After completing his school certificate examinations in December 1959, Mutallab began work as a clerk with the firm of Pannell, Fitzpatrick and Company in Kaduna in January 1960.

He then travelled for further studies, returning to Nigeria in 1968, when he was appointed Chief Accountant of the Defence Industries Corporation of Nigeria. In 1971, he became the financial controller of the New Nigerian Development Company in Kaduna, before becoming the companies general manager in 1975.

Mutallab served as a government minister under General Murtala Mohammed and General Olusegun Obasanjo between 1975 and 1978. First as Federal Commissioner (i.e., Minister) of Economic Development (1975), he was relieved of the position after the 1976 military coup d'état attempt that led to the death of General Murtala Mohammed. However, he was later named the new Minister of Cooperatives and Supplies (1976).

In 1978, he left the cabinet and was made executive vice-chairman, managing director, and CEO of the United Bank for Africa (UBA). He held the office until 1988, and was a major financier of the 1979 presidential election, which brought the National Party of Nigeria to power in the Second Republic led by President Shehu Shagari.

Mutallab has also served on the boards of directors of several companies, including Arewa Textile Limited, NEPA, NACB, NCC, Nigeria Agip Oil, and Cement Company of Nigeria,

From 1999 to 2009, he was the chairman of First Bank of Nigeria Plc, Nigeria's oldest and largest bank. In 2009 he was chairman of several companies, including Impresit Bakolori Plc, Incar Nigeria Plc, and Spring Waters Nigeria Limited (SWAN). He is the major shareholder in Barade Holdings and Barumark Investment and Development Company.

Muttalab played a major role in introducing Islamic banking into Nigeria, and he is the chairman of the Nigeria's first Islamic bank, Jaiz Bank International Plc, which was established in 2003.

Mutallab is chairman of the Business Working Group of the Vision 20:2020 Committee in Nigeria, and president of the Old Boys Association of Barewa College. He is a Fellow of both the Association of Chartered Certified Accountants (FCCA) and the Institute of Chartered Accountants of Nigeria (FCA).

Mutallab was awarded the title of Commander of the Order of the Niger, one of Nigeria's highest honours.

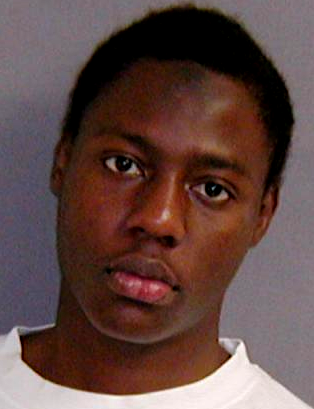
Umar Farouk Abdulmutallab, the suspected Northwest Airlines Flight 253 bomber

== Personal life ==
Though very religious, Mutallab does not consider himself a religious extremist, explaining that he learned the capacity for tolerance while attending Barewa College which had students from many parts of the country and 'gives' a feeling of togetherness. He is a member of what some sections of the Nigerian media have named Kaduna Mafia, a loose group of Nigerian businessmen, civil servants, intellectuals and military officers from Northern Nigeria, who resided or conducted their activities in Kaduna, the former capital of the region towards the end of the First Republic. Mutallab was a close friend and associate of the mafia's financier Hamza Zayyad, who convinced him to take on accounting as a profession.

=== Son: Umar Farouk Abdulmutallab ===
Mutallab had agreed in July 2009 to allow his son, Umar Farouk Abdulmutallab, the youngest of his 16 children and a son of the second of his two wives (who is from Yemen), to return to the Sanaʽa Institute for the Arabic Language in Yemen to study Arabic from August to September 2009. His son apparently left the institute after a month, while remaining in Yemen. In October, his son sent him a text message saying that he wanted to study sharia and Arabic in a seven-year course in Yemen. His father threatened to cut off his funding, whereupon his son said he was "already getting everything for free".

Mutallab reported to two CIA officers at the US Embassy in Abuja, Nigeria, on 19 November 2009, regarding his son's "extreme religious views", and told the embassy that he might be in Yemen. His son's name was added in November 2009 to the US's 550,000-name Terrorist Identities Datamart Environment, a database of the US National Counterterrorism Center. His US visa was not revoked. On 25 December 2009, Umar was implicated in the attempted bombing of Northwest Airlines Flight 253.
