= Malik Ado-Ibrahim =

Nigerian entrepreneur and politician (born 1960)

Personal details
- Born: 22 December 1960 (age 65)
- Party: YPP
- Profession: Entrepreneur, politician

Malik Ado-Ibrahim (born 22 December 1960) is a Nigerian businessman and politician. In 1999 at the age of 38, he became the first black team co-owner of Arrows, the consortium that controlled 70% of the shares of the small soon bankrupt Arrows F1 team. He was the YPP presidential candidate in Nigeria's 2023 presidential election.

== Personal life ==
In 2020, Ibrahim reportedly married Adama Indimi, daughter of a Nigerian billionaire and philanthropist, Mohammed Indimi.

== Political career ==
In June 2022, Ibrahim became the presidential flag bearer of the Young Progressive Party (YPP) against the 2023 Nigerian elections by polling over 66 votes, defeating closest opponent, Ruby Issac, who polled 4 votes.

However, he was not successful in winning the presidential election in the February 25, 2023, presidential polls.

== Business career ==
Prince Malik Ado-Ibrahim is the CEO and Chairman of Nigus Enfinity, a technology-driven solutions provider incorporated under the laws of the Federal Republic of Nigeria on May 23rd, 2001.

== Formula One sponsorship scandal ==
In 1999, Ibrahim bought a one-quarter share of the Arrows F1 Team. In exchange, the Arrows cars received a sponsorship livery for the "T-Minus" brand, which Ibrahim owned. The idea behind the T-Minus brand was that companies and corporations would purchase the rights to use the name and they would be permitted to use the brand to promote their products. However, T-Minus produced no money, and Ibrahim ultimately never paid for his shares. Many credit Ibrahim with single-handedly ruining the Arrows team, which went bankrupt in 2002.
