= Jaiz Bank =

Commercial Institute in Nigeria

Jaiz Bank Plc
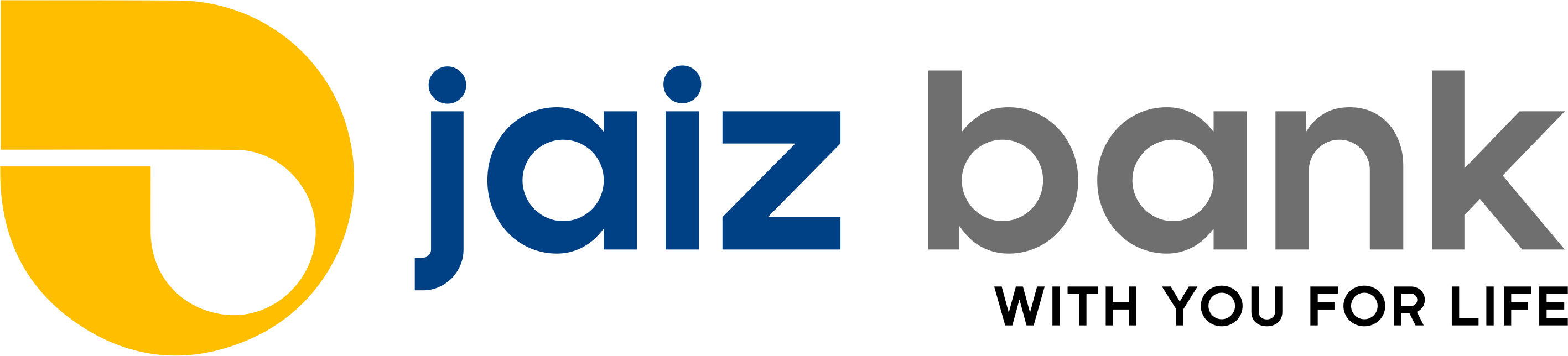

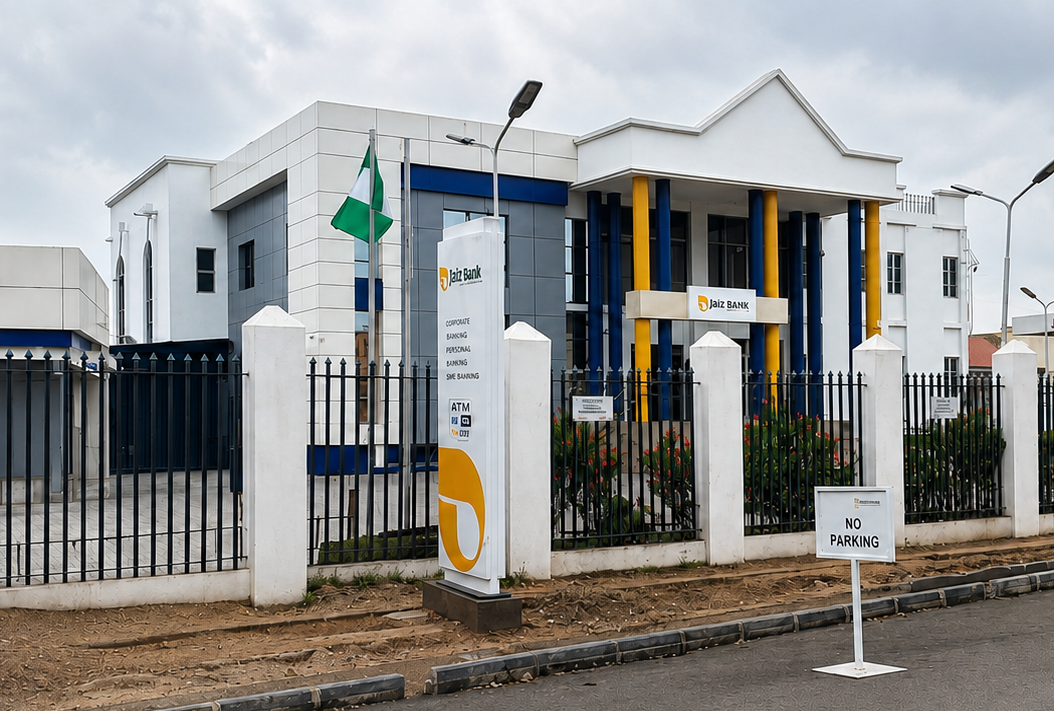
- A Jaiz Bank Branch
- Type: Private
- Traded as: NSE:JAIZBANK
- ISIN: NGJAIZBANK05
- Industry: Banking
- Founded: 2003
- Headquarters: Abuja, Nigeria
- Number of locations: 45 branches (2023)
- Key people: Mohammed Mustapha Bintube (Chairman), Haruna Musa (Managing Director & Chief Executive Officer)
- Products: Savings Account (Mudaraba), Current Account (Qard) Term Deposit Account, Sales Products, Leasing Products, Partnership Products (Financing)
- Revenue: ▼Aftertax:US$26.56 million (NGN:8.01 billion) (2018)
- Total assets: N378.69billion (February 2023)
- Number of employees: 499
- Website: jaizbankplc.com

Jaiz Bank Plc, is a bank in Nigeria operating under Islamic banking principles and is a non-interest bank. It is the first non-interest bank established in Nigeria and is headquartered in Abuja, the capital city of the country.

As of December 2012, the bank was a medium-sized, financial services provider in Nigeria. At that time, the bank's total assets were valued at US$88.8 million (NGN:14.1 billion), with shareholders' equity of about US$63.6 million (NGN:10.1 billion). The Bank operates 27 branches and provides regular ATM service as well as online, mobile, and SMS banking services.

== History ==
The institution was founded in 2003, as Jaiz International Plc. On 11 November 2011, Jaiz International received a license from the Central Bank of Nigeria, the national banking regulator, to operate as a regional bank. On 6 January 2012, the institution commenced business as Jaiz Bank Plc in offices and branches in Abuja, Kaduna and Kano.

In 2013, Jaiz Bank was in the process of expanding to urban centers in all states of the Federal Republic of Nigeria. In pursuit of that goal, the bank had received approval to increase shareholders' capital from the then current value, to US$92.3 million (NGN:14.3 billion). In January 2013, print media reports indicated that, at that time, shareholder's equity in the bank exceeded US$71 million (NGN:11 billion). The bank applied for a national banking license, once it met its shareholders' capital objectives and was issued the license in 2016

== Ownership ==
As of 31 December 2024, the bank’s largest shareholder is Muhammadu Indimi, who holds approximately 24.06% of the issued share capital. Other significant shareholders include:

Jaiz Bank Stock Ownership
Name of Owner	Percentage Ownership
Muhammadu Indimi	24.06%
Dantata Investment & Securities Ltd	11.65%
Umaru Abdul Mutallab	10.13%
Althani Investment Ltd	7.53%
Islamic Development Bank	7.26%
Dangote Industries Limited	7.24%

== See also ==
- List of banks in Nigeria
- Islamic banking
- Interest-free economy
- Economy of Nigeria
