= Essence International School =

School in Nigeria

Coordinates: 10.53353°N 7.44894°E

Information
- Established: 1982; 44 years ago

Essence International School (EIS) is an international school in Kaduna, Nigeria. Located at Kashim Ibrahim close to Sultan road, Ungwan Rimi Kaduna. It was founded in 1982. It serves pre-nursery, nursery, primary, and secondary level of education.

== Notable alumni ==
- Umar Farouq Abdulmutallab
- Nabil Abdulrashid
