= British School of Lomé, Togo =

Coordinates: 6.1734°N 1.2238°E

Information
- Established: 1983

The British School of Lomé (BSL) was established in 1983 to serve expatriate families based in Lomé, Togo.

== Notable alumni ==
- Bello El-Rufai, Nigerian politician and entrepreneur. Member of the Nigerian House of Representatives & Chairman House Committee on Banking Regulations.
- Umar Farouk Abdulmutallab, Nigerian terrorist

== See also ==
- List of international schools
- Education in Togo
