= Mohammed Indimi =

Nigerian business executive (born 1947)

Mohammed Indimi OFR
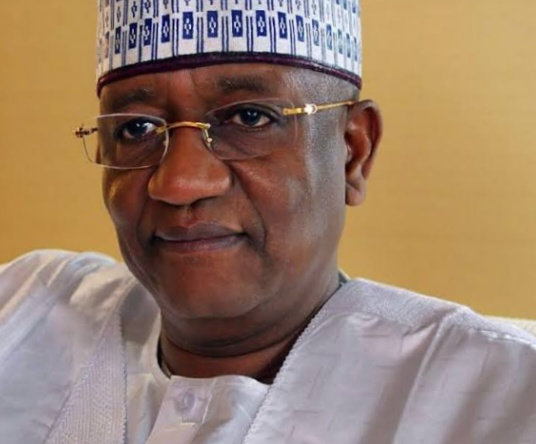
- Born: Mohammed Indimi; 12 August 1947 (age 79); Maiduguri, Borno State, Nigeria
- Occupations: Businessman, philanthropist
- Years active: 1963-present

Mohammed Indimi OFR (born 12 August 1947) is a Nigerian businessman and philanthropist. He is the founder and chairman of Oriental Energy Resources (OER), a privately held Nigerian oil exploration and production company. As of October 2023, his net worth was estimated at US$500 million by Forbes. His net worth plummeted due to crashing oil prices as well as the floating of the Naira.

== Early life and background ==
Indimi was born 12 August 1947, in Maiduguri the capital of Borno State, north-east Nigeria. His father, late Alhaji Mamman Kurundu was also a Hausa businessman who traded in hides and skins. Indimi attended traditional Qur’anic school as it is the general practice of Muslim communities in the Northern Nigeria. He could not attend formal school because his father could not afford to sponsor his formal western education but still managed to learn how to speak, read and write in English.

== Career ==
At the age of 10, Indimi followed his father to local markets around Borno to trade animal hides and skins. In 1963, he became independent and started his own business after he collected 100 pounds loan from his friend Alhaji Umar Tela which he used as a start-up. Eventually, he decided to expand into selling clothes which were imported from Chad and Cameroon.

In 1990, Indimi got oil prospecting license granted by the Ibrahim Badamasi Babangida regime. He established an oil and gas firm named Oriental Energy Resources (OER). Indimi served as chairman and board member of several companies including Jaiz Bank.

== Philanthropy ==
Indimi established Muhammad Indimi Foundation (MIF), which focuses on vulnerable families through the poverty alleviation, fight against hunger, illiteracy and health challenges. He has sponsored native of Borno state to study at the International University of Africa (IUA) on scholarship in Sudan. Through the MIF, Indimi has empowered and supported people affected by the Boko Haram crisis in the North East. He built a 100-unit N600 million housing estate, provided food, clothing, schools and clinics for the Internally Displaced Persons (IDPs) by the Boko Haram insurgency in Borno State. Muhammad Indimi foundation, has built a 100 unit N700 million modern residential estate in Enwang, Mbo LGA Akwa Ibom. He awarded over 470 scholarships in Akwa Ibom State and created a sponsorship program for University of Uyo's Department of Petroleum and Chemical Engineering. Indimi donated a multi-million-dollar International Business Centre to Lynn University in the United States, which was named after him.

== Recognition ==
- Indimi was awarded with Nigerian National Honours, Officer of the Federal Republic of Nigeria (OFR) in 2012.
- He received an honorary doctorate from Lynn University, Florida in 2013
- He received an honorary doctorate from University of Uyo in 2017
- He won the Vanguard (Nigeria) Businessman of the Year in 2017
- He received an honorary doctorate from Nigeria Defense Academy in 2018

== Personal life ==
Indimi is married to Fatima Mustapha Haruna. He has 20 children including Jibrila, Yakolo, Ibrahim, Ahmed, Ameena, Mustapha, Rukaiya, Hauwa, Amina, Zara, Mairama, Amouna, Meram, Habibi, Tijjani, Aya, Abdulrahman, Abdullah, Fatima and Adama.
