= Umar Farouk Abdulmutallab =

Nigerian attempted bomber (born 1986)

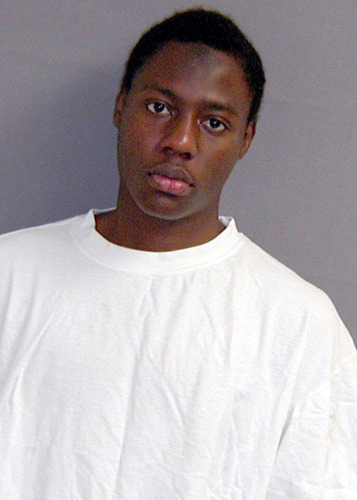
- Mugshot, 2009
- Born: 22 December 1986 (age 39); Lagos, Lagos State, Nigeria
- Education: Essence International School; The British School of Lome; University College London; Iman University
- Criminal charges: Pleaded guilty to the attempted use of a weapon of mass destruction, the attempted murder of 289 people, the attempted destruction of a civilian aircraft, placing a destructive device on an aircraft, and possession of explosives
- Criminal penalty: Four consecutive life sentences plus 50 years without the possibility of parole
- Criminal status: Incarcerated at the Florence ADX, near Florence, Colorado

Umar Farouk Abdulmutallab (Arabic: عمر فاروق عبد المطلب; also known as Umar Abdul Mutallab and Omar Farooq al-Nigeri; born 22 December 1986) popularly referred to as the "Underwear Bomber" or "Christmas Bomber", is a Nigerian terrorist who attempted to detonate plastic explosives hidden in his underwear while on board Northwest Airlines Flight 253, en route from Amsterdam to Detroit, Michigan, U.S., on 25 December 2009.

Al-Qaeda in the Arabian Peninsula (AQAP) claimed to have organised the attack with Abdulmutallab; they said they supplied him with the bomb and trained him. Connections to al-Qaeda and Anwar al-Awlaki have been found, although the latter denied ordering the bombing.

Abdulmutallab was convicted in a U.S. federal court of eight federal criminal counts, including attempted use of a weapon of mass destruction and attempted murder of 289 people. On 16 February 2012, he was sentenced to four life terms plus 50 years without parole. He is incarcerated at ADX Florence, the supermax federal prison in Colorado.

== Background ==
Umar Farouk Abdulmutallab is the youngest of 16 children of Alhaji Umaru Mutallab, a wealthy Nigerian banker and businessman, and his second wife, Aisha (who is from Yemen). The father was described by The Times in 2009 as being "one of the richest men in Africa." He is a former Chairman of First Bank of Nigeria and former Nigerian Federal Commissioner for Economic Development. The family comes from Funtua in Katsina State. Abdulmutallab was raised initially in an affluent neighbourhood of Kaduna, in Nigeria's north.

Abdulmutallab attended Essence International School and also took classes at the Rabiatu Mutallib Institute for Arabic and Islamic Studies, named for his grandfather, at that time. He also attended The British School of Lomé, Togo. He was considered a gifted student, and enjoyed playing PlayStation games and basketball. According to multiple people who knew him at the time, Abdulmutallab became very pious in his teenage years, detaching himself from others his age. He condemned his father's banking profession for charging interest, which is prohibited in Islam, and urged him to quit.

For the 2004–05 academic year, Abdulmutallab studied at the Sanaʽa Institute for the Arabic Language in Sana'a, Yemen, and attended lectures at Iman University.

=== London: September 2005 – June 2008 ===
Abdulmutallab began his studies at University College London in September 2005, where he studied Engineering and Business Finance, and earned a degree in mechanical engineering in June 2008.

He was president of the school's Islamic Society, which some sources have described as a vehicle for peaceful protest against the actions of the United States and the United Kingdom in the war on terrorism. During his tenure as president, along with political discussions, the club participated in activities such as martial arts training and paintballing; at least one of the Society's paintballing trips involved a preacher who reportedly said: "Dying while fighting jihad is one of the surest ways to paradise." He was well liked as president of the society and considered to be moderate though politically engaged. He organized a talk about the detention of terror suspects, and walked down Gower Street in an orange jumpsuit.

He organized a conference in January 2007 under the banner "War on Terror Week", and advertised speakers including political figures, human rights lawyers, speakers from Cageprisoners, and former Guantánamo Bay detainees. One lecture, Jihad v Terrorism, was billed as "a lecture on the Islamic position with respect to jihad".

During those years, Abdulmutallab "crossed the radar screen" of MI5, the UK's domestic counter-intelligence and security agency, for radical links and "multiple communications" with Islamic extremists.

At the age of 21, Abdulmutallab told his parents that he wanted to get married; they refused on the grounds that he had not yet earned a master's degree.

On 12 June 2008, Abdulmutallab applied for and received from the U.S. embassy in London a multiple-entry visa, valid until 12 June 2010, with which he visited Houston, Texas, from 1 to 17 August 2008. After graduating from university, Abdulmutallab made regular visits to the family town of Kaduna, where his father was known for financing local mosque construction and other public works.

=== Dubai: January–July 2009 ===
In May 2009, Abdulmutallab tried to return to Britain, ostensibly for a six-month "life coaching" program at what the British authorities concluded was a fictitious school; the United Kingdom Border Agency denied his visa application. His name was placed on a UK Home Office security watch list which, according to BBC News, meant that he could not enter the UK. Passing through the country in transit was permissible and he was not permanently banned; the UK did not share the information with other countries. This status was based on his visa application being rejected to prevent immigration fraud rather than for a national security purpose.

=== Yemen: August–December 2009 ===
Intelligence officials suspect that Al-Qaeda in the Arabian Peninsula member Anwar al-Awlaki may have directed Abdulmutallab to Yemen for al-Qaeda training. Abdulmutallab's father agreed in July 2009 to his son's request to return to the San'a Institute for the Arabic Language in Yemen, to study Arabic from August to September 2009. He arrived in the country in August. Abdulmutallab was the only African in the 70-student school. A fellow student at the Institute said Abdulmutallab would start his day by going to the mosque for dawn prayers and then spent hours in his room reading the Quran. Ahmed Mohammed, one of his teachers, said Abdulmutallab spent the last 10 days of Ramadan sequestered in a mosque. He apparently left the institute after a month, while remaining in-country.

His family became concerned in August 2009 when he called to say he had dropped the course, but was remaining in Yemen. By September, he routinely skipped his classes at the Institute and attended lectures at Iman University, known for suspected links to terrorism. "He told me his greatest wish was for sharia and Islam to be the rule of law across the world," said one of his classmates at the institute. The Institute obtained an exit visa for him at his request, and on 21 September arranged for him to go the airport to return home. However, he did not leave the country at that time.

In October 2009, Abdulmutallab sent his father a text message saying that he was no longer interested in pursuing an MBA in Dubai, and wanted to study sharia and Arabic in a seven-year course in Yemen. When his father threatened to cut off his funding, Abdulmutallab said he was "already getting everything for free" and refused to tell his father who would support him. He sent more texts stating he would be cutting off contact and disowning his family. The family last had contact with Abdulmutallab in October 2009.

Yemeni officials said that Abdulmutallab was in Yemen from early August 2009, and overstayed his student visa (which was valid through 21 September). He left Yemen on 7 December, flying to Ethiopia, and then two days later to Ghana. Yemeni officials have said that Abdulmutallab travelled to the mountainous Shabwah Province to meet with "al-Qaeda elements" before leaving Yemen. A video of Abdulmutallab and others training in a desert camp, firing weapons at targets including the Star of David, the British Union Jack flag, and the letters "UN", was produced by al-Qaeda in Yemen. The tape includes a statement justifying his actions against "the Jews and the Christians and their agents." Ghanaian officials say he was there from 9 December until 24 December, when he flew to Lagos.

In February 2010, a Yemeni security official said that 43 people were being interrogated for links to the Christmas Day attempt, including foreigners, some of them studying Arabic and others married to Yemeni women. Abdulmutallab was thought to have used Arabic studies as a pretext for entering the country. Saïd Kouachi, one of the attackers—now deceased—in the Charlie Hebdo shooting, is believed to have been one of Abdulmutallab's neighbors at the Yemeni Arabic language school.

==== Awareness by U.S. intelligence ====
On 11 November 2009, British intelligence officials sent the U.S. a cable indicating that a man named "Umar Farouk" had spoken to al-Awlaki, pledging to support jihad, but the cable did not give Abdulmutallab's last name. On 19 November, Abdulmutallab's father consulted with two CIA officers at the U.S. Embassy in Abuja, Nigeria, reporting his son's "extreme religious views", and told the embassy that Abdulmutallab might be in Yemen. Acting on the report, the CIA added the suspect's name in November 2009 to the U.S.'s 550,000-name Terrorist Identities Datamart Environment, a database of the National Counterterrorism Center (NCTC). It was not added to the FBI's 400,000-name Terrorist Screening Database, the terror watch list that feeds both the 14,000-name Secondary Screening Selectee list and the U.S.'s 4,000-name No Fly List, nor was Abdulmutallab's American visa revoked.

U.S. State Department officials said in Congressional testimony that the State Department had wanted to revoke Abdulmutallab's visa, but intelligence officials requested that his visa not be revoked. The intelligence officials said that revoking Abdulmutallab's visa could have foiled a larger investigation into al-Qaeda.

Abdulmutallab's name had come to the attention of intelligence officials many months before that, but no "derogatory information" was recorded about him. A Congressional official said that Abdulmutallab's name appeared in U.S. reports reflecting that he had connections to both al-Qaeda and Yemen. The NCTC did not check to see whether Abdulmutallab's American visa was valid, or whether he had a British visa that was valid; they did not learn that the British had rejected Abdulmutallab's visa application earlier in 2009. British officials had not informed the United States because the visa application was not denied for a national security purpose.

=== Web postings ===
CNN reported that "the many detailed biographical points made by [ internet username Farouk1986 ] match what has been reported about Mutallab's life." The user name posted on Facebook and on Islamic Forum (gawaher.com). On 28 December 2009, a U.S. government official said the government was reviewing the online postings, and has not yet independently confirmed the authenticity of the posts.

CNN reported that by 2005, the postings of Farouk1986 revealed "a serious view of his religion." Tracey D. Samuelson of the Christian Science Monitor further said that the posts "suggest a student preoccupied by university admissions and English soccer clubs, but who was also apparently lonely and conflicted." Philip Rucker and Julie Tate of The Washington Post reviewed 300 online postings by Farouk1986 , and found that "the writings demonstrate an acute awareness of Western customs and a worldliness befitting Mutallab's privileged upbringing as a wealthy Nigerian banker's son."

Farouk1986 discussed loneliness and marriage in his postings between 2005 and 2007, writing about his "struggle to control" his sex drive and his desire to get married so that he could engage in sexual activity in a religiously acceptable way. In January 2006 he chastised female users for not wearing the hijab and stated that it was not appropriate for men and women to be friends.

He also described jihadist fantasies about Muslims engaging in a worldwide jihad and establishing a Muslim empire.

=== Contact with Extremists ===
The New York Times reported in December 2009 that "officials said the suspect told them he had obtained plastic explosives that were sewn into his underwear and a syringe from a bomb expert in Yemen associated with al Qaeda."

In April 2009, Abdulmutallab had applied to attend an Islamic seminar in Houston, Texas. He obtained a multiple-entry visa in the U.S. Consulate in June 2008 that would be valid until June 2010. He attended the Islamic seminar from 1–17 August at AlMaghrib Institute. When Abdulmutallab returned to Yemen later in 2009, purportedly to study Arabic again, he appeared to have undergone a personality change: he was more religious and "a loner", and wore traditional Islamic clothing. He rarely attended class, and sometimes he left class midway to go pray at a mosque.

==== Ties to Anwar al-Awlaki ====
A number of sources reported contacts between Abdulmutallab and Anwar al-Awlaki, an American Yemeni Muslim lecturer and spiritual leader who had been accused of being a senior al-Qaeda talent recruiter and motivator. Al-Awlaki, who was killed by an unmanned United States drone in Yemen in September 2011, was previously an imam in the U.S. He was associated with three of the 9/11 hijackers, who prayed at his mosque; the 2005 London Bombings; a 2006 Toronto terror cell; a 2007 Fort Dix attack plot; and the 2009 Fort Hood shooter.

With a blog and a Facebook page, al-Awlaki had been described as the "bin Laden of the internet." As a fluent English speaker, he had used contemporary technology to communicate with a wide circle of people in the West.

Despite being banned from entering the UK in 2006, al-Awlaki spoke via video-link in 2007–09 on at least seven occasions at five different venues in Britain. During this period he gave a number of video-link lectures at the East London Mosque before being banned by the mosque in 2009.

Pete Hoekstra, the senior Republican on the House Intelligence Committee, said on the day of the attack that Obama administration officials and officials with access to law enforcement information told him "there are reports [the suspect] had contact [with al-Awlaki].... The question we'll have to raise is, was this imam in Yemen influential enough to get some people to attack the U.S. again." He added: "The suspicion is ... that [the suspect] had contact with al-Awlaki. The belief is this is a stronger connection with al-Awlaki" than Hasan had. Hoekstra later said credible sources told him Abdulmutallab "most likely" has ties with al-Awlaki.

==== Meetings with Al-Awlaki ====
The Sunday Times established that Abdulmutallab first met and attended lectures by al-Awlaki in 2005, when he was first in Yemen to study Arabic. Fox News reported that evidence collected during searches of "flats or apartments of interest" connected to Abdulmutallab in London showed that he was a "big fan" of al-Awlaki, based on his web traffic.

However, there is no clear evidence that the two men met in London. NPR reported that, according to unnamed intelligence officials, Abdulmutallab attended a sermon by al-Awlaki at the Finsbury Park Mosque "in the fall of 2006 or 2007", but this was in error, as al-Awlaki was in prison in Yemen during that period. The Finsbury Park Mosque said neither Umar Farouk Abdulmutallab nor Anwar al-Awlaki had ever been invited to attend NLCM since February 2005. CBS News and The Sunday Telegraph initially reported that Abdulmutallab attended a talk by al-Awlaki at the East London Mosque (which al-Awlaki may have participated in by video teleconference), but the mosque officials said that the Sunday Telegraph was misinformed. They said that "Anwar Al Awlaki did not deliver any talks at the ELM between 2005 and 2008".

CBS News said that the two were communicating in the months before the bombing attempt, and sources say that, at a minimum, al-Awlaki was providing spiritual support. According to federal sources, over the year prior to the attack, Abdulmutallab increased his electronic communications with al-Awlaki.

Intelligence officials suspect al-Awlaki may have directed Abdulmutallab to Yemen for al-Qaeda training. One government source described intercepted "voice-to-voice communication" between the two during the autumn of 2009. After being arrested, Abdulmutallab reportedly told the FBI that al-Awlaki was one of his trainers when he did al-Qaeda training in remote camps in Yemen. There were "informed reports" that Abdulmutallab met al-Awlaki during his final weeks of training and indoctrination prior to the attack.

A U.S. intelligence official said that information pointed to connections between the two:

Some of the information ... comes from Abdulmutallab, who ... said that he met with al-Awlaki and senior al-Qaeda members during an extended trip to Yemen this year, and that the cleric was involved in some elements of planning or preparing the attack and in providing religious justification for it. Other intelligence linking the two became apparent after the attempted bombing, including communications intercepted by the National Security Agency indicating that the cleric was meeting with "a Nigerian" in preparation for some kind of operation.

Yemen's Deputy Prime Minister for Defence and Security Affairs, Rashad Mohammed al-Alimi, said Yemeni investigators believe the suspect travelled in October to Shabwa, where he met with suspected al-Qaeda members. They met in a house built and used by al-Awlaki to hold theological sessions, and Abdulmutallab was trained and equipped there with his explosives.

At the end of January 2010, a Yemeni journalist, Abdulelah Haider Shaye, said he met with al-Awlaki, who said he had met and spoken with Abdulmutallab in Yemen in the autumn of 2009. Al-Awlaki reportedly said Abdulmutallab was one of his students, that he supported his actions but had not ordered him, and that he was proud of the young man. A New York Times journalist listened to a digital recording of the meeting, and said that while the tape's authenticity could not be independently verified, the voice resembled that on other recordings of al-Awlaki.

On 6 April 2010, The New York Times reported that U.S. President Barack Obama had authorised the targeted killing of al-Awlaki. The cleric was killed in an American drone attack in Yemen on 30 September 2011.

== Attack ==
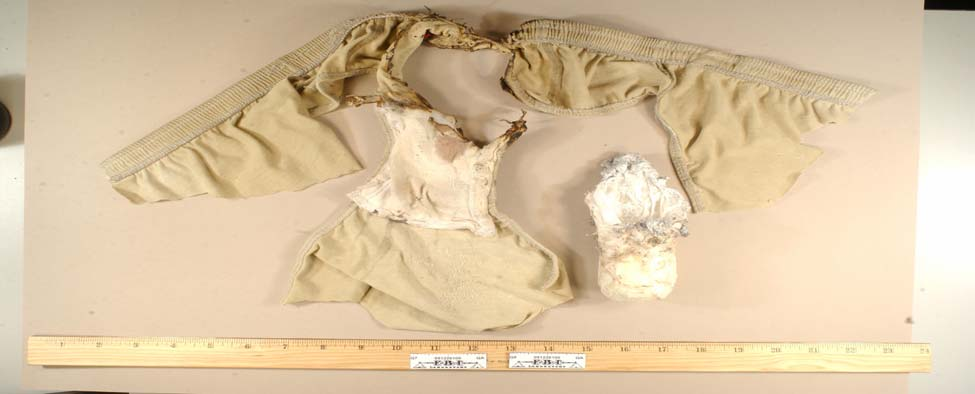
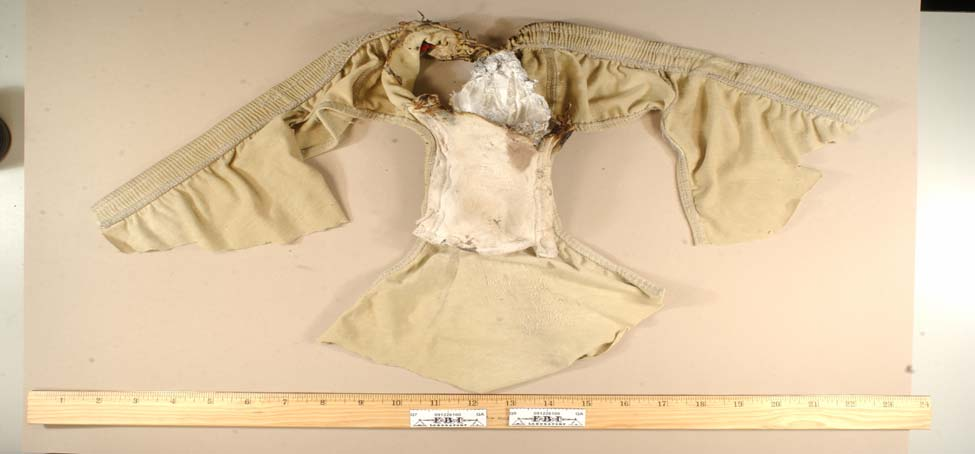
The underwear worn by Abdulmutallab with an explosive packet separated from (top) and inserted in (bottom) a sewn-on pouch at the bottom.

On 25 December 2009, Abdulmutallab travelled from Ghana to Amsterdam, where he boarded Northwest Airlines Flight 253 en route to Detroit. He had a Nigerian passport and valid U.S. tourist visa, and purchased his ticket with cash in Ghana on 16 December. Passengers Kurt and Lori Haskell told The Detroit News that prior to boarding the plane they witnessed a "smartly dressed man" possibly of Indian descent, around 50 years old, and who spoke "in an American accent similar to my own" helping a passenger they identified as Abdulmutallab onto the plane without a passport.

Abdulmutallab spent about 20 minutes in the toilet as the flight approached Detroit, then covered himself with a blanket after returning to his seat. Other passengers heard popping noises and smelled a foul odour. Some saw flames on Abdulmutallab's trouser leg and the wall of the plane. Jasper Schuringa, a Dutch film director, held Abdulmutallab down while flight attendants extinguished the flames. Abdulmutallab was taken toward the front of the aircraft cabin, where he told a flight attendant he had an explosive device in his pocket. The device was a six-inch (15 cm) packet containing the explosive powder PETN, sewn into his underwear.

Abdulmutallab was arrested at Detroit Metropolitan Airport by U.S. Customs and Border Protection (CBP) officers after the incident and turned over to the FBI pending further investigation. Abdulmutallab told authorities he had been directed by al-Qaeda, and that he had obtained the device in Yemen. Al-Qaeda in the Arabian Peninsula, the organisation's affiliate in Yemen, subsequently claimed responsibility for the attack, describing it as revenge for the United States's role in a Yemeni military offensive against al-Qaeda in that country.

== Aftermath ==
Two days after the attack, Abdulmutallab was released from a hospital where he had been treated for first- and second-degree burns to his hands, and second-degree burns to his right inner thigh and genitalia, sustained during the attempted bombing. He was subsequently held at the Federal Correctional Institution, Milan, a federal prison in Michigan, where he remained during court proceedings. New restrictions were imposed on U.S. travelers, but the government did not publicise many of them because security officials reportedly "wanted the security experience to be 'unpredictable'". One day after she said that the system had "worked", Secretary of Homeland Security Janet Napolitano acknowledged that the aviation security system had indeed failed.

U.S. President Barack Obama vowed the federal government would track down all those responsible for the attack, and any attack being planned against the U.S. He also ordered a review of detection and watch list procedures. Saying that "totally unacceptable" systemic and human failures had occurred, Obama told reporters he was insisting on "accountability at every level," but did not give any details. Criticism of the system's failure to prevent Abdulmutallab from boarding the aircraft in the first place has been widespread; one critic, former FBI counterterrorism agent Ali Soufan, has said that the "system should have been lighting up like a Christmas tree."

United States Senator Joe Lieberman called for the Obama administration to pre-emptively curb terrorism in Yemen and halt plans to repatriate Guantanamo detainees to Yemen. Peter Hoekstra and Congressional Representative Peter T. King also called for a halt to the repatriation of Guantanamo detainees from Yemen. Bennie Thompson, Chairman of the House Homeland Security Committee, called for a halt to all current plans with regard to Yemen in light of Abdulmutallab's ties there.

Immediately after the attack, Lateef Adegbite, Secretary General of Nigeria's Supreme Council for Islamic Affairs, condemned the attack and said: "We are embarrassed by this incident and we strongly condemn the alleged action by this young man. We do not think that there is any organised Islamic group in Nigeria that is inclined to such a criminal and violent act. We condemn such an extreme viewpoint and action."

On 27 December, The Wall Street Journal reported that Abdulmutallab's suspected ties to jihadists from Yemen could potentially complicate the Obama administration's plans to release Yemeni detainees held in Guantanamo to Yemen.

On 27 January 2010, the House Committee on Homeland Security continued a series of hearings across Capitol Hill that started prior to 27 January 2010, all looking into the events leading up to and after the attempted bombing of Flight 253 over Detroit. Patrick F. Kennedy, an undersecretary for management at the U.S. State Department, said Abdulmutallab's visa was not taken away because intelligence officials asked his agency not to deny a visa to the suspected terrorist over concerns that a denial would have foiled a larger investigation into al-Qaeda threats against the United States.

Several Muslim organisations and leaders in both the United States and the United Kingdom condemned the terrorist and extremist actions of Abdulmutallab as contrary to Islamic beliefs. Concerns in the media also arose that Nigerians would now be "unduly stigmatized" due to the incident.

Abdulmutallab is now held at United States Penitentiary, Florence ADX.

== Interrogation and court proceedings ==
Abdulmutallab was questioned by the authorities for several hours before being given medical treatment for his injuries.

On 26 December 2009, Abdulmutallab appeared in front of Judge Paul D. Borman of the United States District Court for the Eastern District of Michigan in Detroit and was formally charged with attempting to blow up and placing a destructive device on an American civil aircraft. The hearing took place at the University of Michigan Hospital in Ann Arbor, Michigan, where he was receiving treatment for the burns he suffered when he attempted to detonate the device. Additional charges were added in a grand jury indictment on 6 January 2010, including attempted use of a weapon of mass destruction and attempted murder of 289 people.

Abdulmutallab initially cooperated with investigators, then stopped talking. The decision to read him his Miranda rights, advising him of his right to remain silent, generated criticism from a number of mostly Republican politicians. After the FBI brought two of Abdulmutallab's relatives from Nigeria to the U.S. to speak with him, he once again began to cooperate.

On 14 September 2010, the Associated Press reported Abdulmutallab had dismissed his court-appointed defence team to defend himself. The court subsequently appointed Anthony Chambers to act as standby counsel. On 12 October 2011, Abdulmutallab, against the advice of Chambers, pleaded guilty to the eight charges against him, including the attempted use of a weapon of mass destruction and the attempted murder of the 289 people on the plane. Both charges carried a potential death sentence. He reportedly changed his mind about his plea after the prosecution completed its opening arguments.

Sentencing was initially scheduled for 12 January 2012, but was subsequently postponed to 16 February 2012, to give Abdulmutallab more time to review the presentence investigation report completed by the United States Probation Service. On 13 February 2012, Chambers filed a motion arguing that sentencing his client to life in prison would constitute cruel and unusual punishment under the Eighth Amendment to the United States Constitution because no one other than his client suffered physical harm during the attempted attack. The motion was rejected, and on 16 February 2012, Judge Nancy Edmunds of Federal District Court in Detroit sentenced Abdulmutallab to life in prison. In a statement after the sentencing, Abdulmutallab's family said, "We are grateful to God that the unfortunate incident of that date did not result in any injury or death".

== See also ==
- Naser Jason Abdo, former American soldier
- Michael Finton, American convert to Islam, attempted 2009 bombing of U.S. target with FBI agent he thought was al-Qaeda member
- Hasan Akbar case, American convert to Islam who was convicted of the double-murder of two U.S. Army officers
- Operation Arabian Knight, 2010 arrest of two American men from New Jersey on terrorism charges
- Aafia Siddiqui, female alleged al-Qaeda member, former U.S. resident, convicted in 2010 of attempting to kill American personnel
- Bryant Neal Vinas, American convert to Islam, convicted in 2009 of participating in/supporting al-Qaeda plots in Afghanistan and the U.S.
- Najibullah Zazi, al-Qaeda member, U.S. resident, pleaded guilty in 2010 of planning suicide bombings on New York City subway system
- List of unsuccessful terrorist plots in the United States post-9/11
