= Sanaʽa Institute for the Arabic Language =

- Sa’ilah Street, Sanaa; Yemen

Information
- Motto: "Study Arabic in its homeland"
- Established: 1995
- Director: Muhammad Al-Anasi
- Website: Official website

Sanaʽa Institute for the Arabic Language (SIAL) is located in the Old City of Sanaa, Yemen, on Sa’ilah Street. The school specialises in teaching Arabic as a foreign language.

SIAL also teaches courses in Arabic calligraphy, Islamic studies and Yemeni culture.

The school, located in a house in the Tabariya neighbourhood, attracted many students from the United Kingdom and the United States before the September 11 attacks in 2001. As of 2009, most of the students are from Southeast and East Asia, particularly Indonesia, Malaysia, South Korea, and China.

The founder and director of SIAL is Muhammad Al-Anasi. He attended Reading University in the 1980s and was Arabic language program coordinator for the Peace Corps in Yemen.

== Notable alumni ==
- Umar Farouk Abdulmutallab, the "Underwear Bomber", a Nigerian who attempted to detonate plastic explosives hidden in his underwear while on board Northwest Airlines Flight 253, en route from Amsterdam to Detroit on Christmas Day 2009, enrolled in this school as a pretext to enter Yemen for terrorism purposes.
- Saïd Kouachi, French gunman in the 2015 Charlie Hebdo shooting.
