= List of executive actions by Franklin D. Roosevelt =

The president of the United States may take any of several kinds of executive actions.

Executive orders are issued to help officers and agencies of the executive branch manage the operations within the federal government itself. Presidential memoranda are closely related, and have the force of law on the Executive Branch, but are generally considered less prestigious. Presidential memoranda do not have an established process for issuance, and unlike executive orders, they are not numbered. A presidential determination results in an official policy or position of the executive branch of the United States government. A presidential proclamation is a statement issued by a president on a matter of public policy, under specific authority granted to the president by Congress, typically on a matter of widespread interest. Administrative orders are signed documents such as notices, letters, and orders, that can be issued to conduct administrative operations of the federal government. A presidential notice or a presidential sequestration order can also be issued.

Listed below are executive orders numbered 6071–9537 and presidential proclamations signed by United States President Franklin D. Roosevelt (1933–1945). He issued 3725 executive orders. His executive orders are also listed on Wikisource, along with his presidential proclamations.

Signature of Franklin D. Roosevelt

== Executive orders ==
=== 1933 ===
Relative No.	Absolute No.	Title / Description	Date signed
1	6071	Appointment of August A. Gennerich	March 8, 1933
2	6072	Transfer of Control and Jurisdiction of Certain Buildings at Cristobal to the Navy Department	March 8, 1933
3	6073	Regulations Concerning the Operation of Banks	March 10, 1933
4	6074	Amending Civil Service Rules Pertaining to Appointments	March 13, 1933
5	6075	Reserving Certain Described Lands in Colorado Pending Resurvey	March 15, 1933
6	6076	Reserving Certain Described Lands in New Mexico Pending Resurvey	March 15, 1933
7	6077	Reserving Certain Described Lands in New Mexico Pending Resurvey	March 15, 1933
8	6078	Leafie E. Dietz Designated to Sign President's Name to Land Patents	March 18, 1933
9	6079	Helen V. McLeod Designated to Sign President's Name to Land Patents in Absence of Regular Clerk	March 18, 1933
10	6080	Authorizes Appointment of Bank Conservators, If Necessary, to Protect Bank Assets	March 18, 1933
11	6081	Reserving Certain Described Lands in California for Public Camp Ground Purposes	March 24, 1933
12	6082	Reserving Certain Described Lands in Wyoming Pending Resurvey	March 25, 1933
13	6083	Amending Civil Service Rules Pertaining to Positions Exempt from Examination	March 25, 1933
14	6084	Consolidating Federal Farm Credit Agencies	March 27, 1933
15	6085	Announcing the Index Figures for the Cost of Living for the Six Months' Periods Ending June 30, 1928, and December 31, 1932	March 28, 1933
16	6086	Establishing the Rio Grande Wildlife Refuge	March 28, 1933
17	6087	Certain Described Lands in Colorado Withdrawn Pending Resurvey	March 28, 1933
18	6088	Exemption of Harry O. Bailey from Compulsory Retirement for Age	March 29, 1933
19	6089	Entitlement to Pensions, Parts I, II and III	March 31, 1933
20	6090	Effective Dates of Awards of Disability and Death Pensions; Provisions for Filing Claims and the Review of Claims on Appeal	March 31, 1933
21	6091	Veterans Regulation No. 3: Schedule for Rating Disabilities	March 31, 1933
22	6092	Veterans Regulations No. 4	March 31, 1933
23	6093	Veterans Regulations No. 5	March 31, 1933
24	6094	Veterans Regulation No. 6: Eligibility for Domiciliary or Hospital Care, Including Medical Treatment	March 31, 1933
25	6095	Veterans Regulation No. 7: Eligibility for Medical Care for Veterans of Any War	March 31, 1933
26	6096	Veterans Regulation No. 8: Yearly Renewable Term Insurance	March 31, 1933
27	6097	Veterans Regulation No. 9: Payment of Burial Expenses of Deceased War Veterans	March 31, 1933
28	6098	Veterans Regulation No.10: Miscellaneous Provisions	March 31, 1933
29	6099	Veterans Regulation No.11: Disclosure of Information and Furnishing Copies of Records	March 31, 1933
30	6100	Veterans Regulations No.12: Presumption of Entitlement to Pensions for Spanish-War Veterans and Certain Widows Children, and Dependent Parents of Deceased World War Veterans	March 31, 1933
31	6101	Relief of Unemployment Through The Performance of Useful Public Work (Starting the Civilian Conservation Corps)	April 5, 1933
32	6102	Forbidding the Hoarding of Gold Coin, Gold Bullion, and Gold Certificates	April 5, 1933
33	6103	Exemption of Banking Emergency Employees from Civil Service Rules	April 5, 1933
34	6104	Transfer of Lands in Oregon from the Cascade and Santiam National Forests to the Willamette National Forest	April 6, 1933
35	6105	Appointment of Miss Jessie B. Saunders	April 6, 1933
36	6106	Exemption of Hugh A. Morrison and David E. Roberts, Library of Congress from Compulsory Retirement for Age	April 10, 1933
37	6106-A	Relief of Unemployment Through the Performance of Useful Public Work	April 10, 1933
38	6107	Exemption of Reuben Perry from Compulsory Retirement for Age	April 11, 1933
39	6108	Waiver of Provisions of Executive Order No. 9 of January 17, 1873 for Raymond Moley	April 12, 1933
40	6109	Relief of Unemployment Through the Performance of Useful Public Work	April 12, 1933
41	6110	Modification of Public Water Reserve No. 52, Nevada	April 15, 1933
42	6111	On Transactions in Foreign Exchange	April 20, 1933
43	6112	Partial Revocation of Withdrawal of Certain Lands for Transmission-Line Right-of-Way in California and Nevada	April 22, 1933
44	6113	Withdrawing Lands for Right-of-Way for Transmission Line to Convey Power from Boulder Canyon Project to the City of Los Angeles	April 22, 1933
45	6114	Appointment of Mrs. May Cairns Aimone	April 22, 1933
46	6115	Revision and Codification of the Nationality Laws of the United States	April 25, 1933
47	6116	Public Water Reserve No. 151; California	April 29, 1933
48	6117	Harney National Forest, South Dakota (Lands Added)	May 2, 1933
49	6118	Transferring Control of Certain Land to the Secretary of War (Alaska)	May 2, 1933
50	6119	Withdrawal of Public Lands for Resurvey (California)	May 2, 1933
51	6120	Withdrawal of Public Lands for Resurvey (California)	May 2, 1933
52	6121	Partial Revocation of Withdrawal of Public Lands (California)	May 2, 1933
53	6122	Withdrawal of Public Lands for Resurvey (Colorado)	May 2, 1933
54	6123	Withdrawal of Public Lands for Resurvey (Colorado)	May 2, 1933
55	6124	Withdrawal of Public Lands for Resurvey (Colorado)	May 2, 1933
56	6125	Public Water Restoration No. 75 (Montana, New Mexico, Wyoming)	May 2, 1933
57	6126	Administration of the Emergency Conservation Work (Establishment of Office in District of Columbia Authorized)	May 8, 1933
58	6127	Reimbursement for Supplies Furnished the Emergency Conservation Work	May 8, 1933
59	6128	Amendment of Rules Governing Navigation of the Panama Canal and Adjacent Waters	May 10, 1933
60	6129	Administration of the Emergency Conservation Work (Authorizes Enrollment of 25,000 Veterans)	May 11, 1933
61	6130	Reserving Certain Lands for Federal Buildings (Alaska)	May 11, 1933
62	6131	Relief of Unemployment through the Performance of Useful Public Work (Indian Reservations)	May 12, 1933
63	6131-A	Relief of Unemployment Through the Performance of Useful Public Work (Ordering that Named Naval Surgeons Be Attached to the War Department for Duty With the Civilian Conservation Corps)	May 13, 1933
64	6132	Withdrawing Land for Army Radio Station (Alaska)	May 15, 1933
65	6133	Appointment of Mrs. Elizabeth Horter	May 15, 1933
66	6134	Amendment of Schedules A and B, Civil-Service Rules, Positions Under Farm Credit Administration	May 18, 1933
67	6135	Purchase of National-Forest Lands (allotting $20,000,000 to Secretary of Agriculture)	May 20, 1933
68	6136	Extending the Application of the Act for the Relief of Unemployment through the Performance of Useful Public Work to County Parks and Metropolitan Sections of Municipal Parks	May 20, 1933
69	6137	Revocation of Withdrawal of Public Lands Pending Resurvey (Arizona)	May 22, 1933
70	6138	Revocation of Withdrawal of Public Lands Pending Resurvey (California)	May 22, 1933
71	6139	Revocation of Withdrawal of Public Lands Pending Resurvey (Colorado)	May 22, 1933
72	6140	Revocation of Administrative-Site Withdrawals (Montana)	May 22, 1933
73	6141	Amendment of Schedule B of the Civil Service Rules	May 23, 1933
74	6142	Amending Executive Order No. 5872, of June 30, 1932, So As to Terminate on May 31, 1933, the Exemption of Pickens Neagle, of the Navy Department, From Compulsory Retirement for Age	May 23, 1933
75	6143	Withdrawal of Public Lands to Aid the State in Making Exchange Selections (New Mexico)	May 23, 1933
76	6144	Amendment of Executive Order No. 6129 of May 11, 1933, Entitled "Administration of the Emergency Conservation Work" (25,000 Veterans to Be Enrolled Under Regulations by Director of Emergency Conservation Work)	May 24, 1933
77	6145	Consolidating Government Agencies	May 25, 1933
78	6146	Exemption of Walter L. G. Perry from Compulsory Retirement for Age	May 26, 1933
79	6147	Emergency Conservation Work upon Indian Reservations (establishing fund of $5,875,500, subject to the requisition of Mr. Robert Fechner, Director)	May 26, 1933
80	6148	Relief of Unemployment Through the Performance of Useful Public Work (Ordering That Named Naval Medical and Dental Officers Be Attached to the War Department for Duty With the Civilian Conservation Corps)	May 31, 1933
81	6149	Revocation of Withdrawal of Public Lands Pending Resurvey (New Mexico)	May 31, 1933
82	6150	Revocation of Withdrawal of Public Lands Pending Resurvey (New Mexico)	May 31, 1933
83	6151	Revocation of Withdrawal of Public Lands Pending Resurvey (New Mexico)	June 1, 1933
84	6152	Withdrawal of Public Lands for Classification (Oregon)	June 1, 1933
85	6153	Withdrawal of Public Lands for Resurvey (Colorado)	June 3, 1933
86	6154	Revocation of Administrative-Site Withdrawals (Montana)	June 5, 1933
87	6155	Revocation of Withdrawal of Public Lands Pending Resurvey (New Mexico)	June 5, 1933
88	6156	Veterans Regulation No. 1(a): Entitlement to Pensions	June 6, 1933
89	6157	Veterans Regulation No. 3(a): Schedule for Rating Disabilities	June 6, 1933
90	6158	Veterans Regulation No. 9(a): Payment of Burial Expenses of Deceased War Veterans	June 6, 1933
91	6159	Veterans Regulation No. 10(a): Miscellaneous Provisions	June 6, 1933
92	6160	Administration of the Emergency Conservation Work (This Order Consolidates and Amends Executive Order Nos. 6129, 6136, and 6147)	June 7, 1933
93	6161	Conservation and Development of the Natural Resources of the Tennessee River Drainage Basin	June 8, 1933
94	6162	Construction of Cove Creek Dam on Clinch River (Tennessee Valley Authority)	June 8, 1933
95	6163	Revocation of Withdrawal of Public Lands Pending Resurvey (Colorado)	June 8, 1933
96	6164	Transfer of Land at Army Supply Base (Charleston, South Carolina)	June 8, 1933
97	6165	Tongass National Forest - Alaska (Certain Lands Excluded)	June 10, 1933
98	6166	Organization of Executive Agencies	June 10, 1933
99	6167	Amendment to Regulations Governing Foreign Service Accounting	June 9, 1933
100	6168	Exemption of William A. Taylor from Compulsory Retirement for Age	June 13, 1933
101	6169	Relief of Unemployment Through the Performance of Useful Public Work (Warrant Officers of the Coast Guard, not Exceeding 170, to be Attached to the War Department for Duty With the Civilian Conservation Corps)	June 15, 1933
102	6170	Assistant Secretary of the Interior Authorized to Perform the Duties of the Secretary	June 15, 1933
103	6171	Revocation of Withdrawal of Public Lands Pending Resurvey (California)	June 15, 1933
104	6172	Cache National Forest - Utah (Lands Included)	June 15, 1933
105	6173	Executive Order 6173 on the National Recovery Act	June 16, 1933
106	6174	Executive Order 6174 on the Public Works Administration	June 16, 1933
107	6175	Separation Ratings of Departmental Employees	June 16, 1933
108	6176	Allowance to Rural Carriers for Equipment Maintenance	June 16, 1933
109	6177	Revocation of Withdrawal of Public Lands Pending Resurvey (Arkansas)	June 16, 1933
110	6178	Carson National Forest - New Mexico (Lands Excluded)	June 16, 1933
111	6179	Withdrawal of Public Lands for Resurvey (Utah)	June 16, 1933
112	6179-A	Revocation of Appointment to Classified Positions in the Department of Labor	June 16, 1933
113	6179-B	Abolition of the National Committee on Wood Utilization	June 16, 1933
114	6179-C	Designation of South Trimble, Jr., as Acting Secretary of Commerce	June 16, 1933
115	6180	Withdrawing Land for a Target Range (Arizona)	June 21, 1933
116	6181	Purchases of Land for National Forests	June 24, 1933
117	6182	Regarding Administration of Farm Products	June 26, 1933
118	6183	Revocation of Withdrawal of Public Lands Pending Resurvey (New Mexico)	June 26, 1933
119	6184	Helium Reserve No. 2 (Utah)	June 26, 1933
120	6185	Revocation of Withdrawal of Public Lands Pending Resurvey (Wyoming)	June 26, 1933
121	6186	Revocation of Withdrawal of Public Lands Pending Resurvey (Wyoming)	June 26, 1933
122	6187	Revocation of Withdrawal of Public Lands Pending Resurvey (Wyoming)	June 26, 1933
123	6188	Announcing the Index Figures for the Cost of Living for the Six Months' Period Ending June 30, 1928, and June 30, 1933	July 3, 1933
124	6189	Withdrawal of Lands for Dock Site (Alaska)	July 3, 1933
125	6190	Partial Revocation of Withdrawal of Certain Lands for Transmission-Line Right-of-Way (California)	July 3, 1933
126	6191	Revocation of Withdrawal of Public Lands (California)	July 3, 1933
127	6192	Withdrawal of Public Lands for Resurvey (California)	July 3, 1933
128	6193	Revocation of Withdrawal of Public Lands Pending Resurvey (New Mexico)	July 3, 1933
129	6194	Revocation of Withdrawal of Public Lands Pending Resurvey (Oregon)	July 3, 1933
130	6195	Revocation of Withdrawal of Public Lands Pending Resurvey (Wyoming)	July 3, 1933
131	6196	Administration Under the Emergency Railroad Transportation Act, 1933	July 6, 1933
132	6197	Revocation of Administrative-site Withdrawal (Montana)	July 6, 1933
133	6198	Authorization to Appoint Harold L. Ickes Head of the FEAPW	July 8, 1933
134	6199	Prohibition of Transportation in Interstate and Foreign Commerce of Petroleum and the Products Thereof Unlawfully Produced or Withdrawn from Storage	July 11, 1933
135	6200	Administration of the Emergency Conservation Work (Authority of the Director Stated; Authority to Make Expenditures for Welfare of Civilian Conservation Corps Enrollees)	July 11, 1933
136	6201	Puerto Rico Attached to Internal Revenue Collection District of Maryland	July 11, 1933
137	6201-A	Designation of Miss Louise Polk Wilson to Sign Land Patents	July 11, 1933
138	6202	Phosphate Restoration No. 54 (Wyoming)	July 11, 1933
139	6202-A	Order Creating Executive Council	July 11, 1933
140	6202-B	Providing for the Order of Succession of Officers to Act as Secretary of Treasury	July 11, 1933
141	6203	Appointment of Postmasters Under the Civil Service	July 12, 1933
142	6204	Prohibition of Transportation in Interstate and Foreign Commerce of Petroleum and the Products thereof Unlawfully Produced or Withdrawn from Storage	July 14, 1933
143	6204-A	National Recovery Administration Code for the Rayon Weaving Industry	July 14, 1933
144	6204-B	National Recovery Administration Code for the Throwing Industry	July 14, 1933
145	6205	Reservoir Site Reserve No. 19 (Oregon)	July 14, 1933
146	6205-A	Delegation of Certain Presidential Powers to the Administrator for Industrial Recovery	July 15, 1933
147	6205-B	Exceptions and Exemptions from Codes of Fair Competition	July 15, 1933
148	6205-C	National Recovery Administration Code for the Silk Manufacturing Industry	July 15, 1933
149	6206	Withdrawal of Lands in Aid of Legislation for the Protection of the Water Supply of the City of Los Angeles	July 16, 1933
150	6206-A	National Recovery Administration Code for the Cotton Textile Industry	July 16, 1933
151	6206-B	National Recovery Administration Code for the Cotton Thread Industry	July 16, 1933
152	6206-C	Appointment of Mrs. Bertha Wetherton	July 19, 1933
153	6207	Continuing in Effect the Authority Delegated to the Secretary of Agriculture by Executive Order No. 6182 of June 26, 1933	July 21, 1933
154	6208	Purchase of Forest Lands for Emergency Conservation Work	July 21, 1933
155	6209	Delegation of Presidential Powers to the Secretary of the Interior Relating to Subsistence Homesteads	July 21, 1933
156	6209-A	National Recovery Administration Code for the Textile Finishing Industry	July 21, 1933
157	6209-B	National Recovery Administration Code for the Underwear and Allied Products Industry	July 21, 1933
158	6210	Consolidating the Natural Bridge National Forest with the George Washington National Forest	July 22, 1933
159	6210-A	National Recovery Administration Code for the Silk and Rayon Dyeing and Printing Industry	July 22, 1933
160	6211	Administration of Public Work	July 24, 1933
161	6212	Withdrawal of Public Lands for Classification (California)	July 25, 1933
162	6213	Rental and Subsistence Allowances for Officers	July 25, 1933
163	6214	Exemption of Curtis F. Marbut from Compulsory Retirement for Age	July 25, 1933
164	6214-A	Amendment of Schedule B of the Civil-Service Rules	July 25, 1933
165	6214-B	Appointment of Colvin W. Brown to the Executive Council	July 25, 1933
166	6215	Amendment of Schedule A of the Civil Service Rules	July 26, 1933
167	6216	National Recovery Administration Code for the Shipbuilding and Shiprepairing Industry	July 26, 1933
168	6217	Appointments to the Secret Service Division of the Treasury Department	July 26, 1933
169	6218	Appointment of David A. Gates to the Internal Revenue Service of the Treasury Department	July 26, 1933
170	6219	Healing Arts Practice Regulations for the Canal Zone	July 26, 1933
171	6220	Authorizing Appointment of Louis R. Glavis to Any Position in the Classified Civil Service	July 26, 1933
172	6221	Deferring the Effective Date of Section 18 of Executive Order No. 6166 of June 10, 1933	July 26, 1933
173	6221-A	National Recovery Administration Code for the Wool Textile Industry	July 26, 1933
174	6221-B	National Recovery Administration Code for the National Association of Hosiery Manufacturers	July 26, 1933
175	6221-C	National Recovery Administration Code for the International Association of Garment Manufacturers and Subdivisional Industries Thereof	July 26, 1933
176	6221-D	National Recovery Administration Code for the National Council of Pajama Manufacturers	July 26, 1933
177	6222	Deferring the Effective Date of Section 5 of Executive Order No. 6166 of June 10, 1933, for the Veterans' Administration	July 27, 1933
178	6223	Administration of the Emergency Conservation Work	July 27, 1933
179	6224	Postponement of Certain Provisions of Executive Order No. 6166 of June 10, 1933	July 27, 1933
180	6225	Establishment of the Central Statistical Board	July 27, 1933
181	6226	Providing [Regulations] for Current Encumbrance Reports	July 27, 1933
182	6227	Employees of Certain Executive Agencies Continued in the Service of the United States Temporarily	July 27, 1933
183	6227-A	National Recovery Administration Code for the Cordage and Twine Industry	July 27, 1933
184	6228	Postponement of Certain Provisions and the Transfer of Certain Provisions of Section 2 of Executive Order No. 6166 of June 10, 1933	July 28, 1933
185	6229	Veterans Regulation No. 1(b): Entitlement to Pensions	July 28, 1933
186	6230	Veterans Regulation No. 2(a): Effective Dates of Awards of Disability and Death Pensions; Provisions for Filing Claims; Review of Presumptive Claims by Special Review Boards	July 28, 1933
187	6231	Veterans Regulation No. 3(b): Schedule for Rating Disabilities	July 28, 1933
188	6232	Veterans Regulation No. 6(a}: Eligibility for Domiciliary or Hospital Care, Including Medical Treatment	July 28, 1933
189	6233	Veterans Regulation No. 7(a): Eligibility for Medical Care	July 28, 1933
190	6234	Veterans Regulation No. 10(b): Miscellaneous Provisions	July 28, 1933
191	6235	Power-Site Restoration No. 477 (Oregon)	July 28, 1933
192	6236	Appointment of Henery Roe Cloud as Superintendent of the Haskell Institute, Lawrence, Kansas	July 28, 1933
193	6237	Purchase of National Park Lands	July 28, 1933
194	6237-A	Vesting Certain Power and Authority in the Alien Property Custodian	July 30, 1933
195	6238	Establishment of Science Advisory Board Under the National Research Council	July 31, 1933
196	6239	Deferring the Effective Date of Section 17 of Executive Order No. 6166 of June 10, 1933	August 2, 1933
197	6240	Designating Winfield W. Riefler as Economic Advisor to the Central Statistical Board of the Executive Council	August 3, 1933
198	6241	Inspection of Tax Returns by Special Committee to Investigate Foreign and Domestic, Ocean and Air Mail Contracts, United States Senate	August 3, 1933
199	6242	Designation of Mrs. Alice M. Grove to Sign Land Patents	August 4, 1933
200	6242-A	National Recovery Administration Code for the Coat and Suit Industry	August 4, 1933
201	6242-B	National Recovery Administration Code for the Electrical Manufacturing Industry	August 4, 1933
202	6242-C	Certain Exemptions from the National Recovery Administration Code for the Cotton Textile Industry	August 4, 1933
203	6242-D	Certain Stay of Application and Exemptions from the National Recovery Administration Code for the Cotton Textile Industry	August 4, 1933
204	6242-E	In the Matter of an Application to the National Recovery Administration Code for the Cotton Textile Industry for Exemption	August 4, 1933
205	6243	Postponing Effective Date Transfer of the District Court of the United States for the Panama Canal Zone to Department of Justice	August 5, 1933
206	6244	Postponement of Certain Provisions of Executive Order No. 6166 of June 10, 1933	August 8, 1933
207	6245	Employees of Certain Executive Agencies Continued in the Service of the United States Temporarily	August 9, 1933
208	6246	Administration of the National Industrial Recovery Act	August 10, 1933
209	6247	Preparation, Form, Style, and Safeguarding of Executive Orders and Proclamations	August 10, 1933
210	6248	National Recovery Administration Code for the Corset and Brassiere Industry	August 14, 1933
211	6249	National Recovery Administration Code for the Lace Manufacturing Industry\	August 14, 1933
212	6250	National Recovery Administration Code for the Legitimate Full Length Dramatic and Musical Theatrical Industry	August 16, 1933
213	6251	Designating the Federal Power Commission as an Agency to Aid the Federal Emergency Administrator of Public Works	August 19, 1933
214	6252	Federal Emergency Administration of Public Works	August 19, 1933
215	6253	Code of Fair Competition for the Fishing Tackle Industry	August 19, 1933
216	6254	Code of Fair Competition for the Iron and Steel Industry	August 19, 1933
217	6255	Code of Fair Competition for the Lumber and Timber Products Industries	August 19, 1933
218	6256	Code of Fair Competition for the Petroleum Industry	August 19, 1933
219	6257	Code of Fair Competition for the Photographic Manufacturing Industry	August 19, 1933
220	6258	Withdrawal of Public Lands for Resurvey, New Mexico	August 22, 1933
221	6258-A	Code of Fair Competition for the Automobile Manufacturing Industry	August 26, 1933
222	6258-B	Code of Fair Competition for the Rayon and Synthetic Yarn Producing Industry	August 26, 1933
223	6258-C	Code of Fair Competition for the Hosiery Industry	August 26, 1933
224	6258-D	Code of Fair Competition for the Men's Clothing Industry	August 26, 1933
225	6259	Amendment of Executive Order No. 9-2 of January 28, 1873, Relating to the Holding of State, Municipal, or Other Local Office by Federal Officers and Employees	August 27, 1933
226	6260	Relating to the Hoarding, Export, and Earmarking of Gold Coin, Bullion, or Currency and to Transactions in Foreign Exchange	August 28, 1933
227	6260-A	Administration of the Petroleum Industry	August 28, 1933
228	6261	Relating to the Sale and Export of Gold Recovered from Natural Deposits	August 29, 1933
229	6262	Amendments to Regulations Governing Foreign Service Accounting	August 29, 1933
230	6263	Exemption of Joe Smith from Compulsory Retirement for Age	August 30, 1933
231	6264	Exemption of George P. Metzger from Compulsory Retirement for Age	August 31, 1933
232	6265	Purchase of Forest Lands for Emergency Conservation Work	September 5, 1933
233	6266	Withdrawal of Public Lands for Resurvey	September 6, 1933
234	6267	Withdrawal of Public Lands for Resurvey	September 6, 1933
235	6268	Withdrawal of Public Lands for Resurvey	September 6, 1933
236	6269	Withdrawal of Land for Use by the Washington-Alaska Military Cable and Telegraph System	September 6, 1933
237	6270	Code of Fair Competition for the Motion Picture Laboratory Industry	September 7, 1933
238	6271	Code of Fair Competition for the Wall Paper Manufacturing Industry	September 7, 1933
239	6272	Code of Fair Competition for the Salt Producing Industry	September 7, 1933
240	6273	Code of Fair Competition for the Leather Industry	September 7, 1933
241	6274	In the Matter of the Application of Connecticut Garment Manufacturers Association, for Certain Exemptions from the Coat and Suit Code	September 7, 1933
242	6275	Code of Fair Competition for the Cast Iron Soil Pipe Industry	September 7, 1933
243	6276	Withdrawal of Public Lands to Aid the State in Making Exchange Selections	September 8, 1933
244	6277	Public Water Reserve No. 152, Colorado, Oregon, and Utah	September 8, 1933
245	6278	Partial Revocation of Withdrawal of Certain Lands for Transmission-Line Right of Way, California	September 12, 1933
246	6279	Sturgeon Bay, Wis., Abolished as a Customs Port of Entry	September 12, 1933
247	6280	Revocation of Withdrawal of Public Lands Pending Resurvey, New Mexico	September 13, 1933
248	6281	Knoxville, Tennessee, Abolished as a Customs Port of Entry	September 13, 1933
249	6282	Lincoln, Nebraska, Abolished as a Customs Port of Entry	September 13, 1933
250	6283	New Bern, North Carolina, and Manteo, North Carolina, Abolished as Customs Ports of Entry	September 13, 1933
251	6284	Robbinston, Maine, Abolished as a Customs Port of Entry, Limits of Customs Port of Calais, Maine, Extended	September 13, 1933
252	6284-A	Modifications of Code of Fair Competition for the Petroleum Industry	September 13, 1933
253	6285	Withdrawal of Public Lands for Classification, California	September 14, 1933
254	6286	Withdrawal of Public Lands for Resurvey, New Mexico	September 14, 1933
255	6287	Withdrawal of Public Lands for Resurvey, New Mexico	September 14, 1933
256	6288	Withdrawal of Public Lands for Resurvey, Wyoming	September 14, 1933
257	6289	Code of Fair Competition for the Flower and Feather Industry	September 18, 1933
258	6289-A	Code of Fair Competition for the Bituminous Coal Industry	September 18, 1933
259	6290	Code of Fair Competition for the Gasoline Pump Manufacturing Industry	September 18, 1933
260	6291	Code of Fair Competition for the Linoleum and Felt Base Manufacturing Industry	September 18, 1933
261	6292	Code of Fair Competition for the Oil Burner Industry	September 18, 1933
262	6293	Code of Fair Competition for the Textile Bag Industry	September 18, 1933
263	6294	Code of Fair Competition for the Transit Industry	September 18, 1933
264	6295	Code of Fair Competition for the Underwear and Allied Products Manufacturing Industry	September 18, 1933
265	6296	In the Matter of the Application of Gem-Dandy Garter Company for Certain Exemptions from the Corset and Brassiere Code	September 18, 1933
266	6296-A	Government Contracts	September 22, 1933
267	6297	Modification of Reservoir-Site Reserve No. 17, Pacific Slope Basins, California	September 25, 1933
268	6298	Authorizing the Appointment of Hugh S. Johnson to Serve Temporarily as a Member of Each Code Authority	September 29, 1933
269	6299	Revised Code of Fair Competition for the Bituminous Coal Industry	September 29, 1933
270	6300	Chincoteague, Virginia, Abolished as a Customs Port of Entry	September 30, 1933
271	6301	Further Postponing Effective Date of Transfer of the District Court of the United States for the Panama Canal Zone to the Department of Justice	September 30, 1933
272	6302	Exemption of Clayborn L. Gatewood from Compulsory Retirement for Age	September 30, 1933
273	6303	Consolidating the Kaniksu National Forest with the Pend Oreille National Forest, and Transferring Lands from the Pend Oreille National Forest to the Coeur d'Alene National Forest, Idaho and Washington	September 30, 1933
274	6304	Concerning the President's Reemployment Agreement	October 3, 1933
275	6305	Code of Fair Competition for Bankers	October 3, 1933
276	6306	Code of Fair Competition for the Lime Industry	October 3, 1933
277	6307	Code of Fair Competition for the Farm Equipment Industry	October 3, 1933
278	6308	Code of Fair Competition for the Boiler Manufacturing Industry	October 3, 1933
279	6309	Code of Fair Competition for the Electric Storage and Wet Primary Battery Industry	October 3, 1933
280	6310	Code of Fair Competition for the Textile Machinery Manufacturing Industry	October 3, 1933
281	6311	Code of Fair Competition for the Knitting, Braiding and Wire Covering Machine Industries	October 3, 1933
282	6312	Code of Fair Competition for the Builders Supplies Trade	October 3, 1933
283	6313	Code of Fair Competition for the Boot and Shoe Manufacturing Industry	October 3, 1933
284	6314	Code of Fair Competition for the Laundry and Dry Cleaning Machinery Manufacturing Industry	October 3, 1933
285	6315	Code of Fair Competition for the Saddlery Manufacturing Industry	October 3, 1933
286	6316	Code of Fair Competition for the Ice Industry	October 3, 1933
287	6317	Code of Fair Competition for the Retail Lumber, Lumber Products, Building Materials and Building Specialties	October 3, 1933
288	6318	Code of Fair Competition for the Luggage and Fancy Leather Goods Industry	October 3, 1933
289	6319	Code of Fair Competition for the Women's Belt Industry	October 3, 1933
290	6320	Amending Code of Fair Competition for Oil Burner Industry	October 3, 1933
291	6321	Code of Fair Competition for the Motor Vehicle Retailing Trade	October 3, 1933
292	6322	Code of Fair Competition for the Glass Container Industry	October 3, 1933
293	6323	Amendment of Code of Fair Competition for the Lumber and Timber Products Industries	October 3, 1933
294	6324	Authorizing the Appointment of David H. Morton	October 5, 1933
295	6325	Code of Fair Competition for the Optical Manufacturing Industry	October 9, 1933
296	6326	Code of Fair Competition for the Umbrella Manufacturing Industry	October 9, 1933
297	6327	Code of Fair Competition for the Handkerchief Industry	October 9, 1933
298	6328	Code of Fair Competition for Mutual Savings Banks	October 9, 1933
299	6328-A	Code of Fair Competition for the Automatic Sprinkler Industry	October 9, 1933
300	6329	Amendment of Code of Fair Competition for the Ship Building and Ship Repairing Industry	October 10, 1933
301	6330	Code of Fair Competition for the Silk Textile Industry	October 10, 1933
302	6331	Withdrawal of Public Land for Conservation Camp, California	October 11, 1933
303	6331-A	In the Matter of the Application of Associated Cloak and Suit Manufacturers of Portland, Oregon, for Certain Exemptions from the Coat and Suit Code	October 11, 1933
304	6331-B	Code of Fair Competition for the Compressed Air Industry	October 11, 1933
305	6331-C	Code of Fair Competition for the Heat Exchange Industry	October 11, 1933
306	6331-D	Code of Fair Competition for the Pump Manufacturing Industry	October 11, 1933
307	6331-E	Code of Fair Competition for the Throwing Industry	October 11, 1933
308	6332	Allowance to Rural Carriers for Equipment Maintenance	October 12, 1933
309	6333	Transfer of Lands from the Rainier National Forest to the Columbia National Forest, Washington	October 13, 1933
310	6334	Transfer of Lands from the Rainier National Forest to the Snoqualmie National Forest, Washington	October 13, 1933
311	6335	Transfer of Lands from the Rainier National Forest to the Wenatchee National Forest, Washington	October 13, 1933
312	6336	Transfer of Lands from the Snoqualmie National Forest to the Mount Baker National Forest	October 13, 1933
313	6337	Rules and Regulations Under Section 10(a) and Delegation of Authority Under Section 2(b) of the National Industrial Recovery Act	October 14, 1933
314	6338	Exemption of James S. Goldsmith and George G. Hedgcock from Compulsory Retirement for Age	October 14, 1933
315	6339	Michigan City, Indiana, Abolished as a Customs Port of Entry	October 14, 1933
316	6340	Authorizing the Formation of a Corporation to be Known as the Commodity Credit Corporation	October 16, 1933
317	6341	Extension of Trust Period on Lands of the Morongo Band of Mission Indians, California	October 17, 1933
318	6342	Inspection of Tax Returns by Special Committee to Investigate Receivership and Bankruptcy Proceedings and Appointment of Receivers and Trustees, United States Senate, Authorized	October 18, 1933
319	6343	Designation of and Authorization to the Secretary of the Interior to Acquire Certain Property	October 18, 1933
320	6344	Authorization and Allocation of Funds for Purchase of Lands for Forest Research in Connection with National Arboretum	October 20, 1933
321	6345	Amendment of Executive Order No. 6182 as Supplemented by Executive Order No. 6207, Which Delegated to the Secretary of Agriculture Certain Authority Under the National Industrial Recovery Act	October 20, 1933
322	6346	In the Matter of the Application of the Greensboro Lumber Company and H. A. Taylor, for Certain Exemptions from the Code of Fair Competition for the Lumber and Timber Products Industries	October 20, 1933
323	6347	Further Stay of Part I, Section 1(c) of Code of Fair Competition for the Underwear and Allied Products Manufacturing Industry	October 20, 1933
324	6348	Modifying Agreement Approved July 27, 1933, Between the President of the United States and the Code Committee of the Cordage and Twine Industry	October 20, 1933
325	6349	Code of Fair Competition for the Marking Devices Industry	October 20, 1933
326	6350	Code of Fair Competition for the Cap and Closure Industry	October 20, 1933
327	6351	Code of Fair Competition for the Retail Trade	October 21, 1933
328	6352	Amending Paragraph 6, Subdivision VII, Schedule A of the Civil-Service Rules	October 23, 1933
329	6353	To Effectuate the Provisions of Section 3(e) of Title I of the National Industrial Recovery Act	October 23, 1933
330	6354	Rules and Regulations Under the National Industrial Recovery Act	October 23, 1933
331	6355	Defining Effect of Certain Provisions in Codes of Fair Competition Upon Cooperative Organizations	October 23, 1933
332	6356	Code of Fair Competition for the Industrial Supplies and Machinery Distributors' Trade	October 23, 1933
333	6357	Code of Fair Competition for the Plumbago Crucible Industry	October 23, 1933
334	6358	Code of Fair Competition for the Steel Tubular and Firebox Boiler Industry	October 23, 1933
335	6359	Relating to Gold Recovered from Natural Deposits	October 25, 1933
336	6360	Authorization to Appoint Mr. Wade Crawford	October 25, 1933
337	6361	Withdrawal of Public Lands for Classification, California	October 25, 1933
338	6362	Partial Revocation of Executive Order No. 6143 Withdrawing Certain Lands in New Mexico	October 25, 1933
339	6363	Revocation of Withdrawal of Public Lands Pending Classification as to Coal	October 25, 1933
340	6364	Authorization to Appoint Mrs. Jean Springstead Whittemore	October 26, 1933
341	6365	Greenwich, Middletown, Norwalk, South Manchester, and Stamford, Connecticut, Abolished as Customs Ports of Entry	October 26, 1933
342	6366	Labor Provisions for the Beet Sugar Industry	October 27, 1933
343	6367	Public Water Restoration No. 76, Wyoming	October 31, 1933
344	6368	Code of Fair Competition for the Advertising Specialty Industry	October 31, 1933
345	6369	Code of Fair Competition for the Dress Manufacturing Industry	October 31, 1933
346	6370	Code of Fair Competition for the Fertilizer Industry	October 31, 1933
347	6371	Code of Fair Competition for the Gas Cock Industry	October 31, 1933
348	6372	Code of Fair Competition for the Millinery and Dress Trimming, Braid and Textile Industry	October 31, 1933
349	6373	Code of Fair Competition for the Motor Bus Industry	October 31, 1933
350	6374	Code of Fair Competition for the Packaging Machinery Industry and Trade	October 31, 1933
351	6375	Code of Fair Competition for the Road Machinery Manufacturing Industry	October 31, 1933
352	6376	Code of Fair Competition for the Hair and Jute Felt Industry	October 31, 1933
353	6377	Code of Fair Competition for the Terra Cotta Industry	October 31, 1933
354	6378	Code of Fair Competition for the Canning and Packing Machinery Industry	October 31, 1933
355	6379	Code of Fair Competition for the Paint, Varnish and Lacquer Manufacturing Industry	October 31, 1933
356	6380	Code of Fair Competition for the Nottingham Lace Curtain Industry	November 1, 1933
357	6381	Code of Fair Competition for the Asbestos Industry	November 1, 1933
358	6382	Code of Fair Competition for the Rock Crusher Manufacturing Industry	November 1, 1933
359	6383	Code of Fair Competition for the Novelty Curtains, Draperies, Bedspreads, and Novelty Pillow Industry	November 1, 1933
360	6384	Code of Fair Competition for the Crown Manufacturing Industry	November 1, 1933
361	6385	Code of Fair Competition for the American Petroleum Equipment Industry and Trade	November 2, 1933
362	6386	Code of Fair Competition for the Steel Casting Industry	November 2, 1933
363	6387	Code of Fair Competition for the Copper and Brass Mill Products Industry	November 2, 1933
364	6388	Code of Fair Competition for the Fabricated Metal Products Industry and Metal Finishing and Metal Coating Industry	November 2, 1933
365	6389	Code of Fair Competition for the Soap and Glycerine Manufacturing Industry	November 2, 1933
366	6390	Designation of Marshal as Officer to Disburse Funds for Maintenance and Operation of District Court of the United States for Panama Canal Zone, Etc.	November 3, 1933
367	6391		November 4, 1933
368	6392		November 4, 1933
369	6393		November 4, 1933
370	6394		November 4, 1933
371	6395		November 4, 1933
372	6396	Code of Fair Competition for the Office Equipment Manufacturers Industry	November 4, 1933
373	6397	Code of Fair Competition for the Buffing and Polishing Composition Industry	November 4, 1933
374	6398	Code of Fair Competition for the Buff and Polishing Wheel Industry	November 4, 1933
375	6399		November 4, 1933
376	6400		November 4, 1933
377	6401		November 4, 1933
378	6402		November 4, 1933
379	6403		November 4, 1933
380	6403-A		November 4, 1933
381	6404		November 4, 1933
382	6405		November 4, 1933
383	6406		November 6, 1933
384	6407		November 6, 1933
385	6408	In General Relates to Lands Reserved for Fort Ruger Military Reservation in the Territory of Hawaii	November 7, 1933
386	6409		November 7, 1933
387	6410		November 8, 1933
388	6411		November 8, 1933
389	6412		November 8, 1933
390	6413		November 8, 1933
391	6414		November 8, 1933
392	6415		November 8, 1933
393	6416		November 8, 1933
394	6416-A		November 8, 1933
395	6417		November 8, 1933
396	6418		November 8, 1933
397	6419		November 9, 1933
398	6420		November 9, 1933
399	6420-A		November 9, 1933
400	6420-B	Establishing the Federal Civil Works Administration	November 9, 1933
401	6421		November 10, 1933
402	6422		November 10, 1933
403	6423		November 10, 1933
404	6423-A		November 11, 1933
405	6424		November 13, 1933
406	6425		November 14, 1933
407	6426		November 14, 1933
408	6427		November 14, 1933
409	6428		November 14, 1933
410	6429		November 14, 1933
411	6430		November 14, 1933
412	6431		November 14, 1933
413	6431-A		November 15, 1933
414	6431-B	Labor Provisions for the Wholesale Food and Grocery Trade Approved	November 15, 1933
415	6432		November 16, 1933
416	6433		November 17, 1933
417	6433-A	Establishment of National Emergency Council	November 17, 1933
418	6434		November 17, 1933
419	6435		November 17, 1933
420	6436		November 17, 1933
421	6437		November 17, 1933
422	6438		November 17, 1933
423	6438-A		November 17, 1933
424	6439		November 18, 1933
425	6440	Rates Of Compensation Of Government Employees In Emergency Agencies Not Subject To The Classification Act, And Acts Amendatory Thereof	November 18, 1933
426	6441		November 21, 1933
427	6441-A		November 21, 1933
428	6442		November 22, 1933
429	6443	Authorization to Modify or Make Exceptions in the President's Reemployment Agreement to Avoid Hardships	November 22, 1933
430	6444		November 25, 1933
431	6444-A		November 26, 1933
432	6445		November 27, 1933
433	6446		November 27, 1933
434	6447		November 27, 1933
435	6448		November 27, 1933
436	6449		November 27, 1933
437	6450		November 27, 1933
438	6451		November 27, 1933
439	6452		November 27, 1933
440	6453		November 27, 1933
441	6454		November 27, 1933
442	6455		November 27, 1933
443	6456		November 27, 1933
444	6457		November 27, 1933
445	6458		November 27, 1933
446	6459		November 27, 1933
447	6460		November 27, 1933
448	6461		November 27, 1933
449	6462		November 27, 1933
450	6463		November 27, 1933
451	6464		November 27, 1933
452	6465		November 27, 1933
453	6466		November 27, 1933
454	6467		November 27, 1933
455	6467-A		November 27, 1933
456	6468	In General Relates to Lands Reserved for Fort Ruger Military Reservation in the Territory of Hawaii	November 29, 1933
457	6469		November 29, 1933
458	6470	Creation of the Public Works Emergency Housing Corporation	November 29, 1933
459	6471		November 29, 1933
460	6471-A		December 2, 1933
461	6472	Assignment of Frequencies to Government Radio Stations	December 2, 1933
462	6473		December 4, 1933
463	6473-A		December 4, 1933
464	6474	Creation of the Federal Alcohol Control Administration	December 4, 1933
465	6475		December 4, 1933
466	6476		December 4, 1933
467	6477		December 6, 1933
468	6478		December 6, 1933
469	6479		December 7, 1933
470	6480		December 7, 1933
471	6481		December 7, 1933
472	6482		December 7, 1933
473	6483		December 7, 1933
474	6484		December 7, 1933
475	6485		December 7, 1933
476	6486		December 7, 1933
477	6487		December 7, 1933
478	6487-A		December 9, 1933
479	6487-B		December 9, 1933
480	6488		December 11, 1933
481	6489		December 11, 1933
482	6490		December 12, 1933
483	6491		December 12, 1933
484	6492		December 12, 1933
485	6493		December 12, 1933
486	6494		December 14, 1933
487	6495		December 14, 1933
488	6496		December 14, 1933
489	6497	Amendment of Executive Order No. 6247, of August 10, 1933	December 15, 1933
490	6498	Extension of Trust Period on Indian Lands Expiring During the Year 1934	December 15, 1933
491	6499	Withdrawal of Public Lands for Resurvey (New Mexico)	December 15, 1933
492	6500	Revoking in Part Executive Order No. 5462 of October 14, 1930, Withdrawing Public Land for Customs and Immigration Inspection Purposes (Arizona)	December 15, 1933
493	6501	Code of Fair Competition for the Millinery Industry	December 15, 1933
494	6502	Code of Fair Competition for the Can Manufacturers Industry	December 15, 1933
495	6503	Code of Fair Competition for the Valve and Fittings Manufacturing Industry	December 15, 1933
496	6504	Code of Fair Competition for the Metal Tank Industry	December 15, 1933
497	6505	Code of Fair Competition for the Oxy-Acetylene Industry	December 15, 1933
498	6506	Code of Fair Competition for the Rubber Manufacturing Industry	December 15, 1933
499	6507	Code of Fair Competition for the Hair Cloth Manufacturing Industry	December 15, 1933
500	6508	Code of Fair Competition for the Stone Finishing Machinery and Equipment Industry	December 15, 1933
501	6509	Code of Fair Competition for the Dry and Polishing Mop Manufacturing Industry	December 15, 1933
502	6510	Amendments to Code of Fair Competition for the Men's Clothing Industry	December 15, 1933
503	6510-A	Code of Fair Competition for the Fur Trapping Contractors Industry	December 15, 1933
504	6511	Powers of the National Labor Board Increased	December 16, 1933
505	6512	Amendment of Executive Order No. 6433-A of November 17, 1933; Deferring Until January 16, 1934 the Abolition of Volunteer Field Agencies	December 16, 1933
506	6512-A	Appointment of Charles Brenton Barnes as Presidential Member of the Bituminous Coal Labor Board, for Division I, South	December 16, 1933
507	6513	Adding the Members of the Special Industrial Recovery Board to the National Emergency Council	December 18, 1933
508	6513-A	Code of Fair Competition for the Set Up Paper Box Industry	December 18, 1933
509	6513-B	Code of Fair Competition for the Knitted Outerwear Industry	December 18, 1933
510	6513-C	Code of Fair Competition for the Waxed Paper Industry	December 18, 1933
511	6513-D	Code of Fair Competition for the Domestic Freight Forwarding Industry	December 18, 1933
512	6513-E	Code of Fair Competition for the Wholesale Automotive Trade	December 18, 1933
513	6513-F	Code of Fair Competition for the Non-Ferrous Foundry Industry	December 18, 1933
514	6513-G	Code of Fair Competition for the Refractories Industry	December 18, 1933
515	6513-H	Code of Fair Competition, Fur Dressing and Fur Dyeing Industry	December 18, 1933
516	6513-I	Code of Fair Competition for the Cast Iron Soil Pipe Industry (Amendment Number I)	December 18, 1933
517	6513-J	Amendments to Code of Fair Competition for the Cotton Garment Industry	December 18, 1933
518	6513-K	Amending Code of Fair Competition for the Automobile Manufacturing Industry	December 18, 1933
519	6514	Authorization to the Electric Home and Farm Authority	December 19, 1933
520	6515	Extension of the President's Reemployment Agreement to April 30, 1934	December 19, 1933
521	6515-A	Authorizing Charles E. Wyzanski, Jr., to Act as Secretary of Labor	December 19, 1933
522	6516	Excusing Federal Employees in the District of Columbia from Duty December 23 and 30, 1933	December 20, 1933
523	6517	Amendment of Executive Order No. 6516 of December 20, 1933, Excusing Federal Employees in the District of Columbia from Duty December 23 and 30, 1933	December 21, 1933
524	6518	Waiving Provisions of Executive Order No. 9 of January 17, 1873, Prohibiting Federal Officers and Employees from Holding State or Municipal Offices, as to Martin Conboy	December 21, 1933
525	6519	Code of Fair Competition for Savings, Building and Loan Associations	December 21, 1933
526	6520	Code of Fair Competition for the Grinding Wheel Industry	December 21, 1933
527	6521	Code of Fair Competition for the Rolling Steel Door Industry	December 21, 1933
528	6522	Code of Fair Competition for the Rayon and Silk Dyeing and Printing Industry	December 21, 1933
529	6523	Code of Fair Competition for the Industry Engaged in the Smelting and Refining of Secondary Metals Into Brass and Bronze Alloys in Ingot Form	December 21, 1933
530	6524	Code of Fair Competition for the Rubber Tire Manufacturing Industry	December 21, 1933
531	6525	Modifications of the Code of Fair Competition for the Gasoline Pump Manufacturing Industry	December 21, 1933
532	6526	Denial of Application of the Southern Plow Manufacturers Association and the Blount Plow Works, for Certain Exemptions from the Code of Fair Competition for the Farm Equipment Industry (and Amendment to Code)	December 21, 1933
533	6527	Providing for Notice of Proceedings and Matters in the Administration of the National Industrial Recovery Act (Official Bulletin Board of N.R.A. Established; Effect of Posting Notice)	December 21, 1933
534	6527-A	Additions and Amendments to the Code of Fair Competition for the Petroleum Industry	December 21, 1933
535	6528	Revocation in Part of Executive Order No. 5603 of April 20, 1931, Withdrawing Public Lands, Wyoming	December 23, 1933
536	6529	Code of Fair Competition for the Textile Bag Industry, Modifications of Code	December 23, 1933
537	6530	Code of Fair Competition, Medium and Low Priced Jewelry Manufacturing Industry	December 23, 1933
538	6531	Code of Fair Competition, Silverware Manufacturing Industry	December 23, 1933
539	6532	Code of Fair Competition for the Photo-Engraving Industry	December 23, 1933
540	6533	Code of Fair Competition for Electrotyping and Stereotyping Industry	December 23, 1933
541	6534	Code of Fair Competition for the Paper Distributing Trade	December 23, 1933
542	6535	Code of Fair Competition for the Commercial Refrigerator Industry	December 23, 1933
543	6536	Code of Fair Competition for the Watch Case Manufacturing Industry	December 23, 1933
544	6537	Appointing Members of Temporary Code Authority for the Motor Vehicle Storage and Parking Trade	December 23, 1933
545	6538	Code Authority, Toy and Playthings Industry	December 23, 1933
546	6539	Approving Amendments to Code of Fair Competition for the Lace Manufacturing Industry	December 23, 1933
547	6539-A	Approval of Code of Fair Competition for the Wine Industry	December 27, 1933
548	6539-B	Approval of Code of Fair Competition for the Commercial and Breeder Hatchery Industry	December 27, 1933
549	6539-C	Reinstatement of Former Foreign Service Officers	December 27, 1933
550	6540	Postponement of Certain Provisions of Executive Order No. 6166 of June 10, 1933 (General Postponement of Reorganization Until June 30, 1934)	December 28, 1933
551	6541	Withdrawal of Certain Described Public Lands for Flood Control Purposes, Nevada	December 28, 1933
552	6542	Authorizing the Purchase of Land for Emergency Conservation Work	December 28, 1933
553	6543	Code of Fair Competition for the Retail Food and Grocery Trade	December 30, 1933
554	6543-A	Delegating Further Functions and Powers to the Administrator for Industrial Recovery (Power to Approve Codes for All But Major Industries; to Approve Amendments, Etc.)	December 30, 1933
555	6543-B	Code of Fair Competition for the Household Ice Refrigerator Industry	December 30, 1933
556	6543-C	Code of Fair Competition for the Shoe and Leather Finish, Polish, and Cement Manufacturing Industry	December 30, 1933
557	6543-D	Code of Fair Competition for the Concrete Pipe Manufacturing Industry	December 30, 1933
558	6543-E	Code of Fair Competition for the End Grain Strip Wood Block Industry	December 30, 1933
559	6543-F	Code of Fair Competition for the Cotton Cloth Glove Manufacturing Industry	December 30, 1933
560	6543-G	Code of Fair Competition for the Velvet Industry	December 30, 1933
561	6543-H	Code of Fair Competition for the Coated Abrasives Industry	December 30, 1933
562	6543-I	Code of Fair Competition for the Paper Stationery and Tablet Manufacturing Industry	December 30, 1933
563	6543-J	Code of Fair Competition for the Cinders, Ashes, and Scavenger Trade	December 30, 1933
564	6543-K	Code of Fair Competition for the Cast Iron Pressure Pipe Industry	December 30, 1933
565	6543-L	Code of Fair Competition for the Folding Paper Box Industry	December 30, 1933
566	6543-M	Code of Fair Competition for the Blouse and Skirt Manufacturing Industries	December 30, 1933
567	6543-N	Code of Fair Competition, American Match Industry	December 30, 1933
568	6543-O	Approving Amendments to Code of Fair Competition for the Wall Paper Manufacturing Industry	December 30, 1933
569	6544	Withdrawal of Public Lands for Forest Fire Lookout Sites, Etc., California	December 30, 1933

=== 1934 ===
Relative No.	Absolute No.	Title / Description	Date signed
570	6545	Change of Name of Customs Port of Nyando, New York	January 2, 1934
571	6546	Reserving Certain Described Public Lands in Alaska for Cemetery Purposes	January 2, 1934
572	6547	Amendment of Veterans Regulation No. 2(a)	January 2, 1934
573	6548		January 3, 1934
574	6549		January 3, 1934
575	6549-A		January 4, 1934
576	6550		January 6, 1934
577	6551		January 8, 1934
578	6552		January 8, 1934
579	6553		January 9, 1934
580	6554		January 10, 1934
581	6555		January 12, 1934
582	6556	Amendment of Executive Order No. 6260 of August 28, 1933, Related to the Acquisition of Gold Coin and Gold Bullion	January 12, 1934
583	6557	Waiver of Civil Service Rule IX to Permit the Reinstatement of Mrs. Marie E. Summers in the Government Printing Office	January 12, 1934
584	6557-A	Code of Fair Competition for the Wholesaling or Distributing Trade	January 12, 1934
585	6557-B	Code of Fair Competition for the Carpet and Rug Manufacturing Industry	January 12, 1934
586	6557-C	Approval of Code of Fair Competition for the Raw Peanut Milling Industry	January 12, 1934
587	6558	Relating to Receipt of Gold on Consignment by the Mints and Assay Offices	January 15, 1934
588	6559	Amendment of Executive Order No. 6073 of March 10, 1933 and Proclamation No. 2070 of December 30, 1933, Concerning the Operation of Banks	January 15, 1934
589	6560	Regulating Transactions in Foreign Exchange Transfers of Credit, and the Export of Coin and Currency	January 15, 1934
590	6560-A	Appointment of Mr. F. E. Berquist as a Member of the National Bituminous Coal Industrial Board	January 15, 1934
591	6560-B	Appointment of Mr. John L. Lewis as a Member of the National Bituminous Coal Industrial Board	January 15, 1934
592	6561	Amendment of Executive Order No. 6433-A of November 17, 1933, and of Executive Order No. 6512 of December 16, 1933, to Defer the Abolition of Volunteer Field Agencies	January 16, 1934
593	6562	Prescribing Additional Compensation of Enlisted Men of the Army for Special Qualifications in the Use of Arms	January 18, 1934
594	6563	Revocation of Executive Order No. 5805 of February 23, 1932, Withdrawing Public Lands, New Mexico	January 18, 1934
595	6564	Revocation in Part of Executive Order No. 5098 of April 23, 1929, Withdrawing Public Lands, Wyoming	January 18, 1934
596	6564-A	Retirement of Alfred T. Burri, Foreign Service Officer	January 18, 1934
597	6565	Amendment of Veterans Regulation No. 1(a): Entitlement to Pensions	January 19, 1934
598	6566	Amendment of Veterans Regulation No. 6(a): Eligibility for Domiciliary or Hospital Care, Including Medical Treatment	January 19, 1934
599	6567	Amendment of Veterans Regulation No. 9(a): Payment of Burial expenses of Deceased War Veterans	January 19, 1934
600	6568	Amendment of Veterans Regulation No. 10(b): Miscellaneous Provisions	January 19, 1934
601	6569		January 20, 1934
602	6570		January 20, 1934
603	6571		January 23, 1934
604	6572		January 24, 1934
605	6573		January 24, 1934
606	6574		January 24, 1934
607	6576		January 24, 1934
608	6575-A		January 24, 1934
609	6576		January 24, 1934
610	6577		January 25, 1934
611	6577-A		January 31, 1934
612	6578		January 31, 1934
613	6578-A		January 31, 1934
614	6579		February 1, 1934
615	6580		February 1, 1934
616	6581	Creating The Export-Import Bank of Washington, DC.	February 2, 1934
617	6582		February 3, 1934
618	6583		February 3, 1934
619	6584		February 6, 1934
620	6585	Deferring Effective Date of Section 18 of Executive Order No. 6166 of June 10, 1933	February 6, 1934
621	6586	Revocation of Section 18 of Executive Order No. 6166 of June 10, 1933	February 6, 1934
622	6587		February 6, 1934
623	6588		February 6, 1934
624	6589		February 6, 1934
625	6590		February 8, 1934
626	6590-A		February 8, 1934
627	6590-B		February 8, 1934
628	6591	Directing the Army to Fly the Mail	February 9, 1934
629	6592	Reserving Certain Described Lands in Oregon Pending Legislation	February 9, 1934
630	6593	Authorizing the Beet Sugar Committee to Accept the Voluntary Services of W. Lewis Abbott	February 9, 1934
631	6594	Transferring to the Control and Jurisdiction of the Treasury Department a Portion of the Site of the Naval Reservation, Ediz Hook, Port Angeles, Washington	February 9, 1934
632	6595	Authorizing the Director of the United States Employment Service to Accept Certain Voluntary Services	February 9, 1934
633	6596	Authorizing Willis R. Gregg to Act as Secretary of Agriculture	February 9, 1934
634	6507	Code of Fair Competition for the Chemical Manufacturing Industry	February 10, 1934
635	6598		February 10, 1934
636	6599		February 10, 1934
637	6600		February 10, 1934
638	6601		February 14, 1934
639	6601-A		February 14, 1934
640	6602		February 15, 1934
641	6603		February 15, 1934
642	6603-A		February 15, 1934
643	6604		February 16, 1934
644	6604-A		February 16, 1934
645	6604-B		February 16, 1934
646	6605		February 17, 1934
647	6606	Further Amendment of Veterans Regulation No. 2(a)	February 17, 1934
648	6606-A		February 17, 1934
649	6606-B		February 17, 1934
650	6606-C		February 17, 1934
651	6606-D		February 17, 1934
652	6606-E		February 17, 1934
653	6606-F		February 17, 1934
654	6606-G		February 17, 1934
655	6607		February 20, 1934
656	6608		February 20, 1934
657	6609		February 21, 1934
658	6610		February 21, 1934
659	6611	Authorizing Transfer of the Bureau of Mines to the Department of the Interior	February 22, 1934
660	6612		February 22, 1934
661	6612-A		February 23, 1934
662	6613		February 24, 1934
663	6613-A		February 24, 1934
664	6614		February 26, 1934
665	6615		February 26, 1934
666	6616		February 26, 1934
667	6617	Withdrawal of Public Lands for Use in Connection with Walker River Indian Irrigation Project	February 26, 1934
668	6618		February 26, 1934
669	6619		February 26, 1934
670	6620		February 26, 1934
671	6620-A		February 26, 1934
672	6620-B		February 26, 1934
673	6621		February 28, 1934
674	6622		March 1, 1934
675	6623	Establishment of the Employment Stabilization Office in the Department of Commerce	March 1, 1934
676	6624		March 1, 1934
677	6625		March 5, 1934
678	6626		March 5, 1934
679	6627		March 5, 1934
680	6628		March 5, 1934
681	6629		March 5, 1934
682	6630		March 6, 1934
683	6631		March 6, 1934
684	6631-A		March 6, 1934
685	6632	Establishment of the National Recovery Review Board	March 7, 1934
686	6633		March 7, 1934
687	6634		March 7, 1934
688	6635		March 7, 1934
689	6636		March 8, 1934
690	6637		March 9, 1934
691	6638	Second Authorization for the Export-Import Bank of Washington, DC.	March 9, 1934
692	6639		March 10, 1934
693	6640		March 12, 1934
694	6641		March 12, 1934
695	6642		March 14, 1934
696	6643		March 14, 1934
697	6644	Withdrawal of Public Lands, Colorado	March 14, 1934
698	6645		March 14, 1934
699	6646	Prescribing Measures for Complying with National Recovery Act Codes	March 14, 1934
700	6647		March 17, 1934
701	6647-A		March 17, 1934
702	6647-B		March 17, 1934
703	6648		March 20, 1934
704	6649		March 23, 1934
705	6650		March 23, 1934
706	6651	Establishment of the Office of Special Adviser to the President on Foreign Trade	March 23, 1934
707	6652		March 23, 1934
708	6653		March 23, 1934
709	6654		March 23, 1934
710	6655		March 27, 1934
711	6656	Continuing Executive Committee on Commercial Policy	March 27, 1934
712	6657	Never Distributed & Immediately Superseded by EO 6657-A Which Made Certain Changes to Its Wording	March 27, 1934
713	6657-A	Prescribing Regulations Governing Payment of Losses Sustained by Government Employees Abroad Due to Foreign Currency Appreciation	March 27, 1934
714	6658		March 27, 1934
715	6659		March 27, 1934
716	6660		March 27, 1934
717	6661	Further Amendment of Veterans Regulation No. 1(a): Entitlement to Pensions	March 27, 1934
718	6662	Amendment of Veterans Regulation No. 12: Presumption of Entitlement to Pensions for Spanish-War Veterans and Certain Widows, Children and Dependent Parents of Deceased World War Veterans	March 27, 1934
719	6663		March 31, 1934
720	6664		March 31, 1934
721	6665		March 31, 1934
722	6666		April 5, 1934
723	6667	Withdrawal of Public Lands for Resurvey, Colorado	April 5, 1934
724	6668	Further Amendment of Veterans Regulation No. 1(d) - Entitlement to Pensions	April 6, 1934
725	6669	Further Amendment of Veterans Regulation No. 12 - Presumption of Entitlement to Pensions for Spanish-War Veterans and Certain Widows, Children and Dependent Parents of Deceased World War Veterans	April 6, 1934
726	6670	Transferring Functions of the Veterans' Administration Pertaining to Retirement of Government Civil Employees to the Civil Service Commission	April 7, 1934
727	6671	Withdrawal of Certain Described Lands in Arizona Pending Resurvey	April 7, 1934
728	6672	Withdrawal of Public Lands to be Used for Conservation and Development of Natural Resources; Wyoming	April 7, 1934
729	6673		April 9, 1934
730	6674		April 13, 1934
731	6675		April 13, 1934
732	6675-A	Approval of Code of Fair Competition for the Live Poultry Industry of the Metropolitan Area in and about the City of New York	April 13, 1934
733	6676		April 14, 1934
734	6677		April 14, 1934
735	6678		April 14, 1934
736	6678-A		April 14, 1934
737	6679		April 16, 1934
738	6680	Relating to Uniform Usage in Regard to Geographic Nomenclature and Orthography Throughout the Federal Government	April 17, 1934
739	6681		April 17, 1934
740	6682		April 17, 1934
741	6683		April 19, 1934
742	6684		April 19, 1934
743	6684-A		April 19, 1934
744	6684-B		April 19, 1934
745	6684-C		April 19, 1934
746	6684-D		April 19, 1934
747	6684-E		April 19, 1934
748	6684-F		April 19, 1934
749	6685		April 20, 1934
750	6686		April 20, 1934
751	6686-A		April 21, 1934
752	6687		April 23, 1934
753	6688		April 23, 1934
754	6689		April 24, 1934
755	6690		April 25, 1934
756	6691		April 25, 1934
757	6692	Relates to the Correction / Establishment of Dept. of Justice Seal, Reprinted in DOJ Order No. 2400.3 (Aug. 6, 1998)	April 27, 1934
758	6693	Establishment of the Committee on National Land Problems	April 28, 1934
759	6694		May 1, 1934
760	6694-A		May 1, 1934
761	6695	Amendment of Veterans Regulation No. 9(b) - Payment of Burial expenses of Deceased War Veterans	May 2, 1934
762	6696		May 2, 1934
763	6697		May 2, 1934
764	6698		May 2, 1934
765	6699		May 3, 1934
766	6700		May 4, 1934
767	6701		May 7, 1934
768	6702		May 7, 1934
769	6703		May 7, 1934
770	6704		May 8, 1934
771	6705		May 8, 1934
772	6706		May 9, 1934
773	6707		May 9, 1934
774	6708		May 11, 1934
775	6709		May 14, 1934
776	6710		May 15, 1934
777	6711		May 15, 1934
778	6711-A		May 15, 1934
779	6711-B		May 15, 1934
780	6712		May 21, 1934
781	6713		May 21, 1934
782	6713-A		May 22, 1934
783	6714		May 23, 1934
784	6715	Prescribing the Filing of Functional Organization Charts with the Director of the Bureau of the Budget	May 23, 1934
785	6716		May 23, 1934
786	6717		May 25, 1934
787	6718		May 25, 1934
788	6719		May 25, 1934
789	6720		May 25, 1934
790	6721		May 25, 1934
791	6722		May 26, 1934
792	6723		May 26, 1934
793	6724		May 28, 1934
794	6725		May 28, 1934
795	6725-A		May 28, 1934
796	6726		May 29, 1934
797	6727		May 29, 1934
798	6728		May 29, 1934
799	6729		May 29, 1934
800	6730		May 30, 1934
801	6731		June 5, 1934
802	6731-A		June 6, 1934
803	6732		June 7, 1934
804	6733		June 7, 1934
805	6733-A		June 7, 1934
806	6734		June 8, 1934
807	6734-A		June 9, 1934
808	6735		June 11, 1934
809	6736		June 11, 1934
810	6737		June 14, 1934
811	6738		June 14, 1934
812	6739		June 14, 1934
813	6740		June 15, 1934
814	6741		June 15, 1934
815	6742		June 15, 1934
816	6743		June 15, 1934
817	6744		June 19, 1934
818	6744-A		June 19, 1934
819	6744-B		June 19, 1934
820	6745		June 21, 1934
821	6746		June 21, 1934
822	6747		June 23, 1934
823	6748		June 26, 1934
824	6749		June 27, 1934
825	6750	Prescribing the Procedure for Notice and Hearing on Any Proposed Reciprocal Trade Agreement	June 27, 1934
826	6750-A		June 27, 1934
827	6750-B		June 27, 1934
828	6750-C	Establishment of the Federal Committee on Apprenticeship	June 27, 1934
829	6751		June 28, 1934
830	6752		June 28, 1934
831	6753		June 28, 1934
832	6754		June 28, 1934
833	6755		June 28, 1934
834	6756		June 28, 1934
835	6756-A		June 28, 1934
836	6756-B		June 28, 1934
837	6756-C		June 29, 1934
838	6756-D		June 29, 1934
839	6756-E		June 29, 1934
840	6756-F		June 29, 1934
841	6756-G		June 29, 1934
842	6757	Ordering the Initiation of Studies to Achieve a Program of National Social and Economic Security	June 29, 1934
843	6758		June 29, 1934
844	6759		June 29, 1934
845	6760		June 29, 1934
846	6761		June 29, 1934
847	6762		June 29, 1934
848	6763	Establishment of the National Labor Relations Board	June 29, 1934
849	6764		June 29, 1934
850	6765		June 29, 1934
851	6766	Prescribing the Protection and Conservation of Wild Life by Providing Suitable Refuges	June 29, 1934
852	6767		June 29, 1934
853	6768		June 30, 1934
854	6769		June 30, 1934
855	6770	Establishment of the National Emergency Council	June 30, 1934
856	6771		June 30, 1934
857	6772		June 30, 1934
858	6773		June 30, 1934
859	6674		June 30, 1934
860	6775	Further Amendment of Veterans Regulation No. 6(a) - Eligibility for Domiciliary or Hospital Care, Including Medical Treatment	June 30, 1934
861	6676		June 30, 1934
862	6777	Establishment of the National Resources Board and Abolishment of the Committee on National Land Problems	June 30, 1934
863	6778	Delegation of Authority to the Chairman of and the Director for the Federal Alcohol Control Administration	June 30, 1934
864	6779	Amendment of Executive Order No. 3513 of July 9, 1921, Relating to Applications for Submarine Cable Licenses	June 30, 1934
865	6780	Amendment of Executive Order No. 6657-A Dated March 27, 1934	June 30, 1934
866	6781	Withdrawal of Public Lands for Resurvey; Arizona	June 30, 1934
867	6782	Public Water Restoration No. 78; Montana	June 30, 1934
868	6783	Establishment of the Quetico-Superior Committee	June 30, 1934
869	6784		June 30, 1934
870	6785		June 30, 1934
871	6786		June 30, 1934
872	6786-A		June 30, 1934
873	6787		June 30, 1934
874	6788		June 30, 1934
875	6789		June 30, 1934
876	6790		June 30, 1934
877	6791		July 6, 1934
878	6792		July 11, 1934
879	6793	Prescribing the Land Policy, Program, and Procedure in Relation to the Shelterbelt Project	July 11, 1934
880	6794		July 11, 1934
881	6795		July 26, 1934
882	6796		July 27, 1934
883	6797		July 27, 1934
884	6798		July 27, 1934
885	6799		July 27, 1934
886	6800		July 27, 1934
887	6801		July 27, 1934
888	6801-A		July 27, 1934
889	6801-B		July 27, 1934
890	6802		August 4, 1934
891	6803		August 4, 1934
892	6804		August 4, 1934
893	6805		August 4, 1934
894	6806		August 4, 1934
895	6807		August 4, 1934
896	6808		August 4, 1934
897	6809		August 4, 1934
898	6810		August 4, 1934
899	6810-A		August 4, 1934
900	6811		August 4, 1934
901	6812		August 4, 1934
902	6813		August 9, 1934
903	6814	Order Prescribing the Delivery of All Silver to the United States for Coinage	August 9, 1934
904	6815		August 10, 1934
905	6816		August 10, 1934
906	6817		August 10, 1934
907	6818		August 11, 1934
908	6819		August 11, 1934
909	6820		August 11, 1934
910	6821		August 11, 1934
911	6822		August 13, 1934
912	6823		August 16, 1934
913	6824	Waiving Provisions of Executive Order of January 17, 1873, Prohibiting Federal Officers and Employees from Holding State or Municipal Offices, as to Robert H. Jackson	August 16, 1934
914	6825		August 20, 1934
915	6826		August 21, 1934
916	6827		August 21, 1934
917	6828		August 21, 1934
918	6829		August 21, 1934
919	6830		August 23, 1934
920	6831		August 23, 1934
921	6832		August 23, 1934
922	6833		August 28, 1934
923	6834		August 29, 1934
924	6835		August 29, 1934
925	6836		August 31, 1934
926	6837		August 31, 1934
927	6838		September 1, 1934
928	6839		September 3, 1934
929	6840	Establishment of the Board of Inquiry for the Cotton Textile Industry	September 5, 1934
930	6841		September 11, 1934
931	6842		September 11, 1934
932	6843		September 11, 1934
933	6844		September 11, 1934
934	6845		September 11, 1934
935	6846		September 11, 1934
936	6847		September 11, 1934
937	6847-A		September 14, 1934
938	6848		September 15, 1934
939	6849		September 15, 1934
940	6850		September 18, 1934
941	6851		September 22, 1934
942	6852		September 22, 1934
943	6853	Withdrawal of Public Lands for Use in Connection with Duck Valley Indian Irrigation Project	September 22, 1934
944	6854		September 22, 1934
945	6855		September 25, 1934
946	6856		September 25, 1934
947	6857		September 25, 1934
948	6858	In General (Related to Abolishing the Board of Inquiry for the Cotton Textile Industry)	September 26, 1934
949	6859	Establishment of the National Industrial Recovery Board within the National Emergency Council	September 27, 1934
950	6860		September 27, 1934
951	6860-A		September 27, 1934
952	6861		September 28, 1934
953	6862		September 30, 1934
954	6863		October 3, 1934
955	6864		October 3, 1934
956	6865		October 4, 1934
957	6866		October 5, 1934
958	6867		October 5, 1934
959	6868		October 9, 1934
960	6869		October 10, 1934
961	6870		October 10, 1934
962	6870-A		October 11, 1934
963	6871		October 12, 1934
964	6872		October 12, 1934
965	6873		October 16, 1934
966	6874		October 16, 1934
967	6875		October 16, 1934
968	6876		October 16, 1934
969	6877	Establishment of the Wool Textile Work Assignment Board	October 16, 1934
970	6878		October 16, 1934
971	6879		October 17, 1934
972	6880		October 22, 1934
973	6881		October 22, 1934
974	6882		October 22, 1934
975	6883		October 22, 1934
976	6883-A		October 22, 1934
977	6883-B		October 22, 1934
978	6884		October 23, 1934
979	6885		October 23, 1934
980	6885-A		October 25, 1934
981	6886		October 27, 1934
982	6887		October 29, 1934
983	6888		October 29, 1934
984	6889		October 29, 1934
985	6889-A	Ordering the Consolidation of the National Emergency Council, the Executive Council and the Industrial Emergency Committee	October 29, 1934
986	6890		October 30, 1934
987	6891		October 30, 1934
988	6892		October 30, 1934
989	6892-A		October 30, 1934
990	6893		October 31, 1934
991	6894		November 1, 1934
992	6895		November 2, 1934
993	6895-A		November 2, 1934
994	6896		November 7, 1934
995	6897		November 7, 1934
996	6898		November 8, 1934
997	6899		November 8, 1934
998	6900		November 8, 1934
999	6901		November 13, 1934
1000	6902		November 13, 1934
1001	6903		November 14, 1934
1002	6904		November 15, 1934
1003	6905		November 15, 1934
1004	6906		November 19, 1934
1005	6907		November 19, 1934
1006	6908	Withdrawal of Public Lands to be Used for Conservation and Development of Natural Resources; Alaska	November 21, 1934
1007	6909		November 21, 1934
1008	6910	Withdrawal of Public Lands to be Used for Conservation and Development of Natural Resources	November 26, 1934
1009	6910-A		December 1, 1934
1010	6910-B		December 1, 1934
1011	6911		December 3, 1934
1012	6912		December 3, 1934
1013	6913		December 4, 1934
1014	6914		December 4, 1934
1015	6915		December 6, 1934
1016	6916		December 7, 1934
1017	6917	Creating a Body Corporate to be Known as Federal Prison Industries, Inc.	December 11, 1934
1018	6918		December 12, 1934
1019	6919		December 12, 1934
1020	6920		December 13, 1934
1021	6920-A		December 14, 1934
1022	6920-B		December 14, 1934
1023	6920-C		December 14, 1934
1024	6921		December 15, 1934
1025	6922		December 15, 1934
1026	6923		December 18, 1934
1027	6924		December 18, 1934
1028	6925		December 18, 1934
1029	6925-A		December 19, 1934
1030	6926	Extension of Trust Period on Indian Lands in Oklahoma Expiring During the Year 1935	December 20, 1934
1031	6927		December 21, 1934
1032	6927-A		December 21, 1934
1033	6928		December 24, 1934
1034	6929		December 26, 1934
1035	6929-A		December 26, 1934
1036	6930		December 27, 1934
1037	6931		December 27, 1934
1038	6932		December 28, 1934
1039	6933		December 28, 1934
1040	6934		December 29, 1934
1041	6935	Placing Wake Island, Kingman Reef, Johnston Island and Sand Island in the Pacific Ocean under the Control and Jurisdiction of the Secretary of the Navy	December 29, 1934
1042	6935-A	Approving Agreement between Members of the Division of the Painting, Paperhanging and Decorating Division of the Construction Industry and Painter Employees in the Region of St. Paul, Minnesota and Vicinity	December 29, 1934

=== 1935 ===
Relative No.	Absolute No.	Title / Description	Date signed
1043	6936	Announcing the Index Figures for the Cost of Living for the 6 Months' Periods Ending June 30, 1928, and December 31, 1934	January 4, 1935
1044	6937		January 4, 1935
1045	6938		January 4, 1935
1046	6939	Extension of Trust Period on Allotments Made to Indians of the Spokane Reservation	January 7, 1935
1047	6940	Extension of Trust Period on Lands of the Pala Band of Mission Indians	January 7, 1935
1048	6941		January 8, 1935
1049	6942	Relates to the List of unhealthful Posts Established by Executive Order No. 5640 of June 8, 1931	January 8, 1935
1050	6943		January 9, 1935
1051	6944		January 9, 1935
1052	6945		January 10, 1935
1053	6945-A		January 10, 1935
1054	6946		January 11, 1935
1055	6946-A		January 11, 1935
1056	6947		January 12, 1935
1057	6947-A		January 16, 1935
1058	6948		January 17, 1935
1059	6948-A		January 18, 1935
1060	6948-B		January 19, 1935
1061	6949		January 22, 1935
1062	6949-A		January 22, 1935
1063	6950		January 23, 1935
1064	6951		January 24, 1935
1065	6952		January 24, 1935
1066	6952-A		January 24, 1935
1067	6953		January 25, 1935
1068	6953-A		January 28, 1935
1069	6953-B		January 29, 1935
1070	6954		January 31, 1935
1071	6955		January 31, 1935
1072	6955-A		February 1, 1935
1073	6956		February 4, 1935
1074	6957		February 4, 1935
1075	6958		February 4, 1935
1076	6959		February 4, 1935
1077	6960		February 4, 1935
1078	6961	Extension of Trust Periods on Allotments Made to Indians of the Klamath Reservation	February 4, 1935
1079	6962	Extension of Trust Periods on Allotments Made to Indians of the Colville Reservation	February 4, 1935
1080	6963	Veterans Regulation No. 10 (d), Miscellaneous Provisions	February 5, 1935
1081	6964		February 5, 1935
1082	6964-A		February 5, 1935
1083	6964-B		February 5, 1935
1084	6965		February 7, 1935
1085	6966		February 8, 1935
1086	6967	Veterans Regulation No. 1 (f), Entitlement to Pensions	February 8, 1935
1087	6967-A		February 8, 1935
1088	6968	Extension of Trust Period on Allotments Made to Indians of the Crow Creek Band of Sioux	February 9, 1935
1089	6969	Code of Fair Competition for the Cigarette, Snuff, Chewing, and Smoking Tobacco Manufacturing Industry	February 9, 1935
1090	6970		February 15, 1935
1091	6971		February 19, 1935
1092	6972		February 19, 1935
1093	6973		February 19, 1935
1094	6973-A		February 20, 1935
1095	6973-B		February 20, 1935
1096	6974		February 21, 1935
1097	6974-A		February 21, 1935
1098	6975		February 26, 1935
1099	6976		February 26, 1935
1100	6977		February 28, 1935
1101	6978		February 28, 1935
1102	6979	Designating the Secretary of the Interior to Carry out Oil Regulation	February 28, 1935
1103	6980		March 1, 1935
1104	6980-A		March 1, 1935
1105	6980-B		March 1, 1935
1106	6980-C		March 1, 1935
1107	6981		March 2, 1935
1108	6982		March 5, 1935
1109	6983		March 6, 1935
1110	6984		March 7, 1935
1111	6984-A		March 7, 1935
1112	6985		March 8, 1935
1113	6985-A		March 8, 1935
1114	6986		March 9, 1935
1115	6987		March 9, 1935
1116	6988		March 11, 1935
1117	6988-A		March 16, 1935
1118	6989	Veterans Regulation No. 1 (g), Entitlement to Pensions	March 19, 1935
1119	6990	Veterans Regulation No. 2 (d), Effective Dates of Awards of Disability and Death Pensions; Provisions for Filing Claims; Review of Presumptive Claims by Special Review Boards	March 19, 1935
1120	6991		March 19, 1935
1121	6992	Veterans Regulation No. 10 (e), Miscellaneous provisions	March 19, 1935
1122	6992-A		March 20, 1935
1123	6992-B		March 20, 1935
1124	6993		March 21, 1935
1125	6994		March 21, 1935
1126	6995		March 21, 1935
1127	6996		March 21, 1935
1128	6996-A		March 22, 1935
1129	6997		March 25, 1935
1130	6998		March 25, 1935
1131	6999		March 30, 1935
1132	7000		April 5, 1935
1133	7001	Extension of Trust Periods on Allotments Made to Indians of the Crow Reservation	April 5, 1935
1134	7002		April 5, 1935
1135	7003		April 8, 1935
1136	7004		April 10, 1935
1137	7005		April 10, 1935
1138	7006		April 10, 1935
1139	7007		April 10, 1935
1140	7008		April 10, 1935
1141	7009	Extension of Trust Period on Lands of the Torres-Martinez Band of Mission Indians	April 10, 1935
1142	7010		April 10, 1935
1143	7010-A		April 10, 1935
1144	7010-B		April 10, 1935
1145	7010-C		April 10, 1935
1146	7010-D		April 10, 1935
1147	7010-E		April 10, 1935
1148	7010-F		April 10, 1935
1149	7010-G		April 10, 1935
1150	7010-H		April 11, 1935
1151	7010-I		April 12, 1935
1152	7011		April 15, 1935
1153	7012	Amendment of Instructions to Diplomatic Officers and of Consular Regulations	April 15, 1935
1154	7013		April 16, 1935
1155	7014		April 19, 1935
1156	7015		April 19, 1935
1157	7016		April 19, 1935
1158	7017		April 19, 1935
1159	7018		April 19, 1935
1160	7019		April 19, 1935
1161	7020		April 19, 1935
1162	7021		April 19, 1935
1163	7022		April 20, 1935
1164	7023		April 22, 1935
1165	7024		April 22, 1935
1166	7024-A		April 24, 1935
1167	7024-B		April 25, 1935
1168	7025		April 29, 1935
1169	7025-A		April 29, 1935
1170	7026		April 30, 1935
1171	7027	Establishing the Resettlement Administration	April 30, 1935
1172	7028	Transferring the Land Program of F.E.R.A. to the Resettlement Administration	April 30, 1935
1173	7029		April 30, 1935
1174	7030		April 30, 1935
1175	7031		May 1, 1935
1176	7032		May 1, 1935
1177	7033		May 1, 1935
1178	7033-A		May 1, 1935
1179	7034	Creating Machinery for the Works Progress Administration	May 6, 1935
1180	7035		May 6, 1935
1181	7035-A		May 7, 1935
1182	7035-B		May 7, 1935
1183	7035-C		May 7, 1935
1184	7035-D		May 7, 1935
1185	7036	Extension of Trust Periods on Allotments Made to Indians of the Yakima Reservation	May 8, 1935
1186	7036-A		May 9, 1935
1187	7036-B		May 9, 1935
1188	7036-C		May 9, 1935
1189	7036-D		May 10, 1935
1190	7037	Establishing the Rural Electrification Administration	May 11, 1935
1191	7038		May 13, 1935
1192	7039		May 14, 1935
1193	7040		May 15, 1935
1194	7041	Transferring Subsistence Homesteads Activities to the Resettlement Administration	May 15, 1935
1195	7042		May 15, 1935
1196	7043		May 15, 1935
1197	7044		May 15, 1935
1198	7045		May 15, 1935
1199	7046		May 20, 1935
1200	7047		May 20, 1935
1201	7048		May 20, 1935
1202	7049		May 21, 1935
1203	7050		May 21, 1935
1204	7051		May 21, 1935
1205	7052		May 21, 1935
1206	7053		May 23, 1935
1207	7054		May 23, 1935
1208	7055		May 28, 1935
1209	7056		May 28, 1935
1210	7057	Establishing the Puerto Rico Reconstruction Administration	May 28, 1935
1211	7058		May 29, 1935
1212	7059		May 31, 1935
1213	7059-A	Changing the Name of the Luquillo National Forest, Puerto Rico	June 4, 1935
1214	7060		June 5, 1935
1215	7061		June 5, 1935
1216	7062	Relates to the List of Unhealthful Posts Established by Executive Order No. 5644 of June 8, 1931	June 5, 1935
1217	7063		June 5, 1935
1218	7064	Continuing the Powers of the Administrator of Public Works Under N.I.R.A.	June 7, 1935
1219	7065	The National Resources Committee is Created	June 7, 1935
1220	7066		June 7, 1935
1221	7067		June 7, 1935
1222	7068		June 8, 1935
1223	7069		June 11, 1935
1224	7070		June 12, 1935
1225	7071		June 12, 1935
1226	7072		June 12, 1935
1227	7073	Reestablishing the National Emergency Council	June 13, 1935
1228	7074	Reestablishing the National Labor Relations Board	June 15, 1935
1229	7075	Reorganizing the N.R.A.	June 15, 1935
1230	7076	Extending the Activities of the N.R.A.	June 15, 1935
1231	7077		June 15, 1935
1232	7078		June 17, 1935
1233	7079	Withdrawal of Public Lands for the Use of the Department of the Interior 1939	June 17, 1935
1234	7080		June 19, 1935
1235	7081	Revocation of Executive Order No. 6497, December 15, 1933	June 20, 1935
1236	7082		June 23, 1935
1237	7083		June 24, 1935
1238	7084		June 24, 1935
1239	7085		June 24, 1935
1240	7085-A		June 25, 1935
1241	7086	Establishing the National Youth Administration	June 26, 1935
1242	7087		June 27, 1935
1243	7088		June 27, 1935
1244	7089		June 29, 1935
1245	7090		June 29, 1935
1246	7091		June 29, 1935
1247	7092		July 3, 1935
1248	7093		July 8, 1935
1249	7094		July 8, 1935
1250	7095		July 8, 1935
1251	7096		July 9, 1935
1252	7097		July 9, 1935
1253	7098		July 12, 1935
1254	7099		July 12, 1935
1255	7100		July 15, 1935
1256	7100-A		July 15, 1935
1257	7101		July 16, 1915
1258	7102		July 18, 1935
1259	7103		July 18, 1935
1260	7104		July 18, 1935
1261	7105		July 18, 1935
1262	7106		July 19, 1935
1263	7107		July 19, 1935
1264	7108		July 19, 1935
1265	7109		July 19, 1935
1266	7110		July 22, 1935
1267	7111		July 22, 1935
1268	7112		July 24, 1935
1269	7113		July 25, 1935
1270	7114		July 25, 1935
1271	7115		July 25, 1935
1272	7116		July 26, 1935
1273	7117		July 29, 1935
1274	7118		July 29, 1935
1275	7119		July 30, 1935
1276	7120	Reorganizing the Consumers' Agencies	July 30, 1935
1277	7120-A		July 30, 1935
1278	7121		July 31, 1935
1279	7122		July 31, 1935
1280	7123		August 1, 1935
1281	7124		August 5, 1935
1282	7125		August 5, 1935
1283	7126	Placing Additional Agencies Under the Supervision of the Bureau of the Budget	August 5, 1935
1284	7126-A		August 5, 1935
1285	7127		August 6, 1935
1286	7128		August 6, 1935
1287	7129		August 6, 1935
1288	7129-A		August 6, 1935
1289	7130		August 7, 1935
1290	7131		August 7, 1935
1291	7132		August 7, 1935
1292	7133		August 7, 1935
1293	7134		August 8, 1935
1294	7135		August 9, 1935
1295	7136		August 12, 1935
1296	7137		August 12, 1935
1297	7138		August 12, 1935
1298	7139	Extending the Jurisdiction of the Electric Home and Farm Authority	August 12, 1935
1299	7140		August 13, 1935
1300	7141		August 13, 1935
1301	7142		August 14, 1935
1302	7143		August 19, 1935
1303	7144		August 19, 1935
1304	7145		August 19, 1935
1305	7146		August 19, 1935
1306	7147		August 19, 1935
1307	7148		August 19, 1935
1308	7149		August 19, 1935
1309	7150	Placing Additional Agencies under the Supervision of the Bureau of the Budget	August 19, 1935
1310	7151		August 21, 1935
1311	7152		August 21, 1935
1312	7153		August 21, 1935
1313	7154		August 22, 1935
1314	7154-A		August 22, 1935
1315	7155		August 23, 1935
1316	7156		August 23, 1935
1317	7157		August 23, 1935
1318	7158		August 23, 1935
1319	7158-A		August 23, 1935
1320	7159		August 24, 1935
1321	7160		August 26, 1935
1322	7161		August 27, 1935
1323	7162		August 27, 1935
1324	7163		August 29, 1935
1325	7164		August 29, 1935
1326	7165		August 29, 1935
1327	7166		August 29, 1935
1328	7167		August 29, 1935
1329	7168		September 4, 1935
1330	7169		September 4, 1935
1331	7170	Opened the Lower Souris River National Wildlife Refuge	September 4, 1935
1332	7171		September 4, 1935
1333	7172		September 4, 1935
1334	7173		September 4, 1935
1335	7174	Placing Additional Agencies Under the Supervision of the Bureau of the Budget	September 4, 1935
1336	7175		September 6, 1935
1337	7176		September 6, 1935
1338	7177		September 6, 1935
1339	7178		September 6, 1935
1340	7179		September 6, 1935
1341	7180		September 6, 1935
1342	7181		September 6, 1935
1343	7182		September 7, 1935
1344	7183		September 12, 1935
1345	7183-A		September 12, 1935
1346	7184		September 13, 1935
1347	7185		September 20, 1935
1348	7186		September 21, 1935
1349	7187		September 24, 1935
1350	7188		September 24, 1935
1351	7189		September 25, 1935
1352	7190		September 25, 1935
1353	7191		September 25, 1935
1354	7192		September 26, 1935
1355	7193	Coordinator for Industrial Cooperation	September 26, 1935
1356	7194		September 26, 1935
1357	7195		September 26, 1935
1358	7196		September 26, 1935
1359	7197		September 26, 1935
1360	7198		September 26, 1935
1361	7199		September 26, 1935
1362	7200		September 26, 1935
1363	7201		September 26, 1935
1364	7202		September 28, 1935
1365	7203		October 1, 1935
1366	7204		October 1, 1935
1367	7205		October 14, 1935
1368	7206	Extension of Trust Periods on Indian Lands	October 14, 1935
1369	7207		October 14, 1935
1370	7208		October 19, 1935
1371	7209		October 19, 1935
1372	7210		October 24, 1935
1373	7211		October 24, 1935
1374	7212		October 24, 1935
1375	7213		October 24, 1935
1376	7214		October 24, 1935
1377	7215		October 26, 1935
1378	7216		October 28, 1935
1379	7217		October 30, 1935
1380	7218		October 30, 1935
1381	7219		October 30, 1935
1382	7220		October 30, 1935
1383	7221		October 31, 1935
1384	7221-A		October 31, 1935
1385	7222		November 1, 1935
1386	7223		November 9, 1935
1387	7224		November 13, 1935
1388	7224-A		November 14, 1935
1389	7225		November 15, 1935
1390	7226		November 15, 1935
1391	7227		November 18, 1935
1392	7228		November 18, 1935
1393	7229		November 19, 1935
1394	7230		November 20, 1935
1395	7231		November 20, 1935
1396	7232		November 23, 1935
1397	7233		November 23, 1935
1398	7234		November 25, 1935
1399	7235		November 26, 1935
1400	7236		November 27, 1935
1401	7237		November 27, 1935
1402	7238		November 28, 1935
1403	7239		December 3, 1935
1404	7240		December 4, 1935
1405	7241		December 4, 1935
1406	7242		December 6, 1935
1407	7243		December 6, 1935
1408	7244		December 10, 1935
1409	7245		December 10, 1935
1410	7246		December 10, 1935
1411	7247		December 10, 1935
1412	7248		December 10, 1935
1413	7249		December 12, 1935
1414	7250		December 16, 1935
1415	7251	Assignment of Frequencies to Government Radio Stations	December 19, 1935
1416	7252	Terminating the National Recovery Administration	December 21, 1935
1417	7253		December 21, 1935
1418	7254		December 21, 1935
1419	7255		December 21, 1935
1420	7256		December 21, 1935
1421	7257		December 26, 1935
1422	7258		December 28, 1935
1423	7259		December 28, 1935
1424	7260		December 31, 1935
1425	7261	Postponement of Effective Date of Certain Provisions of Executive Order No. 6166, June 10, 1933	December 31, 1935
1426	7261-A	Amendment to the Instructions to Diplomatic Officers of the United States	December 31, 1935

=== 1936 ===
Relative No.	Absolute No.	Title / Description	Date signed	FR Citation
1427	7262	Amendment of Executive Order No. 3206 of December 30, 1919, Establishing the Board of Surveys and Maps	January 4, 1936	
1428	7263		January 4, 1936	
1429	7264		January 4, 1936	
1430	7265		January 4, 1936	
1431	7266		January 4, 1936	
1432	7267		January 6, 1936	
1433	7268		January 6, 1936	
1434	7269		January 7, 1936	
1435	7270		January 7, 1936	
1436	7271		January 9, 1936	
1437	7272		January 10, 1936	
1438	7273		January 10, 1936	
1439	7274		January 14, 1936	
1440	7275		January 15, 1936	
1441	7276		January 17, 1936	
1442	7277		January 17, 1936	
1443	7278		January 23, 1936	
1444	7279		January 25, 1936	
1445	7280		January 28, 1936	
1446	7280-A		February 1, 1936	
1447	7280-B		February 1, 1936	
1448	7281		February 3, 1936	
1449	7282		February 3, 1936	
1450	7283		February 3, 1936	
1451	7284		February 3, 1936	
1452	7284-A		February 6, 1936	
1453	7284-B		February 6, 1936	
1454	7285	Prescribing the Official Flag of the Vice President of the United States	February 7, 1936	
1455	7286		February 8, 1936	
1456	7287		February 10, 1936	
1457	7288		February 11, 1936	
1458	7289		February 14, 1936	
1459	7290		February 14, 1936	
1460	7291		February 14, 1936	
1461	7292		February 14, 1936	
1462	7293		February 14, 1936	
1463	7294		February 14, 1936	
1464	7295		February 14, 1936	
1465	7296		February 15, 1936	
1466	7297		February 16, 1936	
1467	7298	Regulations Governing the Preparation, Presentation, Filing, and Distribution of Executive Orders and Proclamations	February 18, 1936	
1468	7299		February 20, 1936	
1469	7300		February 21, 1936	
1470	7301		February 21, 1936	
1471	7302		February 21, 1936	
1472	7303		February 25, 1936	
1473	7304		February 27, 1936	
1474	7305		February 28, 1936	
1475	7306		February 28, 1936	
1476	7307		February 28, 1936	
1477	7308		February 28, 1936	
1478	7309		February 28, 1936	
1479	7310		February 28, 1936	
1480	7311		February 29, 1936	
1481	7312		March 9, 1936	
1482	7313		March 10, 1936	
1483	7314		March 11, 1936	
1484	7315		March 11, 1936	
1485	7316	Enlarging Cape Romain Migratory Bird Refuge, South Carolina	March 13, 1936	1
1486	7317	Exemption of Milton L. Leffler from Compulsory Retirement for Age	March 14, 1936	
1487	7318	Authorizing Louis Hunter Gwinn for Appointment as Customs Agent in the Treasury Department Without Regard to Civil Service Rules	March 18, 1936	
1488	7319	Amendment of Executive Order No. 7164 of August 29, 1935, Prescribing Rules and Regulations Relating to Student-Aid Projects and to Employment of Youth on Other Projects under the Emergency Relief Appropriation Act of 1935	March 18, 1936	43
1489	7320	Establishing Kellys Slough Migratory Waterfowl Refuge, North Dakota	March 19, 1936	51
1490	7321		March 21, 1936	
1491	7322		March 21, 1936	
1492	7323	Creating a Committee to Complete the Summary of the Results and Accomplishments of the National Recovery Administration and Report Thereon	March 21, 1936	81
1493	7324		March 30, 1936	101
1494	7325		March 30, 1936	101
1495	7326		March 30, 1936	101
1496	7327		March 30, 1936	101
1497	7328		March 30, 1936	102
1498	7329		March 30, 1936	102
1499	7330		March 30, 1936	102
1500	7331		April 3, 1936	149
1501	7332		April 3, 1936	149
1502	7333		April 3, 1936	149
1503	7334		April 3, 1936	149
1504	7335		April 3, 1936	150
1505	7336	Exemption of Frank Hahn from Compulsory Retirement for Age	April 9, 1936	
1506	7337		April 9, 1936	186
1507	7338		April 10, 1936	186
1508	7339		April 10, 1936	186
1509	7340		April 10, 1936	187
1510	7341		April 10, 1936	187
1511	7342		April 10, 1936	
1512	7343		April 10, 1936	187
1513	7344		April 11, 1936	193
1514	7345		April 15, 1936	243
1515	7346		April 15, 1936	
1516	7347		April 15, 1936	243
1517	7348		April 15, 1936	
1518	7349		April 18, 1936	
1519	7350		April 20, 1936	
1520	7351		April 21, 1936	
1521	7352		April 23, 1936	309
1522	7353		April 23, 1936	309
1523	7354		April 30, 1936	367
1524	7355	Colorado, Revocation of EO 6054, Withdrawing Public Lands	April 30, 1936	367
1525	7356	Camp Eagle Pass, Texas, Portion Transferred to Treasury Department	May 4, 1936	397
1526	7357	Arizona, Partial Revocation of EO of Sept. 23, 1912, Withdrawing Public Lands	May 4, 1936	397
1527	7358	Reinstatement of Certain Former Foreign Service Officers	May 5, 1936	
1528	7359	Nicolet National Forest, Wis., Lands Included In	May 5, 1936	397
1529	7360	New Mexico, Partial Revocation of EO 6076, Withdrawing Public Lands	May 5, 1936	397
1530	7361	Carson National Forest, N. Mex., Amendment of EO 4929, Withdrawing Certain Lands Within the Rio Pueblo de Taos Watershed from Entry or Other Disposition	May 5, 1936	398
1531	7362	Wyoming, Partial Revocation of EO's 5323 and 6473, Withdrawing Public Lands	May 5, 1936	398
1532	7363	Amendment of EO 6964, Withdrawing All Public Land in Certain States	May 6, 1936	407
1533	7364	Charles Sheldon Wildlife Refuge, Nev., Enlargement	May 6, 1936	407
1534	7365	Second Export-Import Bank of Washington, D.C., Dissolved	May 7, 1936	431
1535	7366	Social Security Board, Initial Appointments to Certain Positions Without Compliance With the Civil Service Act and Rules	May 7, 1936	
1536	7367	Sweeney, (Mrs.) Eva, Appointment to Classified Position in the Department of Agriculture Without Regard to the Civil Service Act and Rules	May 9, 1936	
1537	7368	Jarvis, Baker and Howland Islands in the Pacific Ocean, Placed Under the Control and Jurisdiction of the Secretary of the Interior	May 13, 1936	469
1538	7369	Amendment of Executive Order No. 9 of January 17, 1873, Relating to the Holding of State or Local Offices by Federal Officers and Employees	May 13, 1936	469
1539	7370	Civil Service Rules, Amendment of Paragraph 10 (a), Section IV, Schedule A of Civil Service Rules; U.S. Military Academy	May 13, 1936	
1540	7371	Emergency Conservation Work, Amendment of EO 6160, Prescribing Rules and Regulations Relating to the Administration of	May 18, 1936	491
1541	7372	Civil Service Rules, Amendment of Schedule A	May 18, 1936	
1542	7373	Desert Game Range, Nevada, Establishment	May 20, 1936	501
1543	7374	New Mexico, Revocation of EO 6499, Withdrawing Public Lands	May 20, 1936	501
1544	7375	Arizona, Revocation of EO 4289, Withdrawing Land for Use as Emergency Airplane Landing Field	May 20, 1936	502
1545	7376		May 20, 1936	502
1546	7377		May 20, 1936	502
1547	7378		May 22, 1936	523, 621
1548	7379		May 26, 1936	575
1549	7380		May 27, 1936	
1550	7381		June 3, 1936	637
1551	7382		June 4, 1936	653
1552	7383		June 5, 1936	653
1553	7384		June 8, 1936	667
1554	7385		June 8, 1936	
1555	7386		June 8, 1936	667
1556	7387		June 15, 1936	703
1557	7388		June 15, 1936	703
1558	7389		June 15, 1936	703
1559	7390		June 15, 1936	
1560	7391	Modifying Boundaries of Savannah River Wild Life Refuge, Georgia and South Carolina	June 17, 1936	713
1561	7392		June 19, 1936	754
1562	7393		June 19, 1936	
1563	7394		June 19, 1936	
1564	7395		June 19, 1936	
1565	7396		June 22, 1936	761
1566	7397	Federal Fire Council	June 20, 1936	
1567	7398		June 23, 1936	765
1568	7399		June 23, 1936	765
1569	7400		June 23, 1936	767
1570	7401		June 23, 1936	
1571	7402		June 26, 1936	801
1572	7403		June 26, 1936	
1573	7404		July 1, 1936	837
1574	7405		July 6, 1936	863
1575	7406		July 6, 1936	863
1576	7407		July 6, 1936	863
1577	7408		July 6, 1936	
1578	7409		July 9, 1936	898
1579	7410		July 9, 1936	899
1580	7411		July 9, 1936	913
1581	7412		July 10, 1936	914
1582	7413		July 10, 1936	
1583	7414		July 10, 1936	
1584	7415		July 17, 1936	993
1585	7416		July 17, 1936	993
1586	7417		July 17, 1936	993
1587	7418		July 20, 1936	1009
1588	7419		July 20, 1936	
1589	7420		July 20, 1936	
1590	7421	The President Places Postmasters Under Civil Service Regulation	July 20, 1936	1017
1591	7422		July 23, 1936	1033
1592	7423		July 26, 1936	1033
1593	7424		July 26, 1936	1033
1594	7425		August 1, 1936	1089
1595	7426		August 6, 1936	1179
1596	7427		August 6, 1936	1179
1597	7428		August 11, 1936	
1598	7429		August 17, 1936	1299
1599	7430		August 17, 1936	1299
1600	7431		August 17, 1936	
1601	7432		August 18, 1936	
1602	7433		August 18, 1936	1335
1603	7434		August 18, 1936	1335
1604	7435		August 19, 1936	1335
1605	7436		August 21, 1936	1391
1606	7437		August 21, 1936	1391
1607	7438		August 21, 1936	
1608	7439		August 24, 1936	
1609	7440		August 25, 1936	
1610	7441		August 29, 1936	1451
1611	7442		August 31, 1936	1513
1612	7443		August 31, 1936	1513
1613	7444		September 7, 1936	
1614	7445		September 8, 1936	
1615	7446		September 11, 1936	1563
1616	7447		September 11, 1936	1563
1617	7448		September 12, 1936	1575
1618	7449		September 16, 1936	
1619	7450		September 17, 1936	1631
1620	7451	Transferring Certain Lands to the Control and Jurisdiction of the Secretary of the Navy (California)	September 17, 1936	1631
1621	7452	Addition to Upper Mississippi River Wild-Life and Fish Refuge, Minnesota and Wisconsin	September 19, 1936	1631
1622	7453	Withdrawal of Public Land for Lookout Station (California)	September 23, 1936	1697
1623	7454	Revocation of Executive Order Nos. 6671 and 6781 of April 7, 1934, and June 30, 1934, Respectively, Withdrawing Public Lands (Arizona)	September 23, 1936	1697
1624	7455	Exemption of Henry W. Langheim from Compulsory Retirement for Age	September 25, 1936	
1625	7456	Exemption of Lemuel W. Bean from Compulsory Retirement for Age	September 25, 1936	
1626	7457	Exemption of Bernard H. Lane from Compulsory Retirement for Age	September 25, 1936	
1627	7458	Transferring to the Rural Electrification Administration Established by the Rural Electrification Act of 1936 the Functions, Property, and Personnel of the Rural Electrification Administration Established by Executive Order No. 7037 of May 11, 1933	September 26, 1936	1709
1628	7459	Amendment of Paragraph 7, Subdivision III, Schedule A, Civil Service Rules (Public Health Service Employees)	September 26, 1936	1709
1629	7460	Designating the Chairman of the United States Maritime Commission (Henry A. Wiley)	September 26, 1936	1725
1630	7461	Placing Certain Lands Under the Control of the Secretary of the Interior (Alabama)	September 26, 1936	1725
1631	7462	Placing Certain Land Under the Control of the Secretary of the Interior (Florida)	September 26, 1936	1725
1632	7463	Abolishing Fort Pierce, Florida, as a Customs Port of Entry	September 29, 1936	1737
1633	7464	Extending Certain Periods of Trust on Indian Lands	September 30, 1936	1743
1634	7465	Designation of Under Secretary, Assistant Secretary, and Chief of the Weather Bureau, Department of Agriculture, to Act as Secretary of Agriculture	October 6, 1936	1785
1635	7466	Authorizing the Purchase of Certain Lands in the Jefferson National Forest and Allocating Funds Therefor (Virginia)	October 7, 1936	1803
1636	7467	Transferring Certain Lands to the Control and Jurisdiction of the Secretary of the Navy (California)	October 7, 1936	1803
1637	7468	Exemption of James W. Sims from Compulsory Retirement for Age	October 8, 1936	
1638	7469	Increasing the Amounts Available for Public Projects Under Clauses (F) and (G) of the Emergency Relief Appropriation Act of 1936. (Increasing Amounts for Educational, Professional and Clerical Persons and for Women's Projects)	October 13, 1936	1833
1639	7470	Regulations Governing the Authentication of Certified Copies of the Foreign Public Records, the Manner of Executing and Returning Commissions by Consular and Diplomatic Officers in Criminal Cases, and Schedules of Fees and Compensation Allowable in Such Cases	October 15, 1936	1881
1640	7471	Gaging Station Site Reserve No. 2, Santa Ysabel Creek, California	October 15, 1936	1884
1641	7472	Modification of Executive Order No. 7140 of August 13, 1935, to Permit Mrs. Ruth Hampton, Assistant Director, Division of Territories and Island Possessions, Department of the Interior, to Acquire a Classified Civil Service Status	October 15, 1936	
1642	7473	Exemption of Harry Planert from Compulsory Retirement for Age	October 15, 1936	
1643	7474	Extending the Limits of Customs Port of Entry of Brownsville, Texas	October 17, 1936	1901
1644	7475	Exemption of George G. Hedgcock from Compulsory Retirement for Age	October 19, 1936	
1645	7476	Establishing Long Tail Point Migratory Waterfowl Refuge, Wisconsin	October 23, 1936	1927
1646	7477	Exemption of William McNeir from Compulsory Retirement for Age	October 24, 1936	
1647	7478	Exemption of Adrian J. Pieters from Compulsory Retirement for Age	October 24, 1936	
1648	7479	Designation of the Director of the Geological Survey to Act as Secretary of the Interior	October 27, 1936	1959
1649	7480	Exemption of Adolph Kress from Compulsory Retirement for Age	October 27, 1936	
1650	7481	Interdepartmental Committee to Coordinate Health and Welfare Activities	October 27, 1936	
1651	7482	Designating Morehead City, North Carolina, as a Customs Port of Entry	October 30, 1936	1977
1652	7483	Authorizing the Special Committee to Investigate Production, Transportation, and Marketing of Wool, United States Senate to Inspect Income, Profits and Capital Stock Tax Returns	November 2, 1936	2041
1653	7484	Addition to Cedar Keys Bird Refuge (Florida)	November 6, 1936	2041
1654	7485	Revocation of Executive Order No. 2124 of January 20, 1915, Establishing Ediz Hook Reservation (Washington)	November 6, 1936	2042
1655	7486	Partial Revocation of Executive Order No. 4539 of November 6, 1926, Withdrawing Public Lands (Utah)	November 6, 1936	2042
1656	7487	Amendment of Paragraph 6, Subdivision VII, Schedule A, Civil Service Rules (Temporary Clerks, Etc., in the Postal Service)	November 6, 1936	2043
1657	7487-A	Designation of R. Walton Moore, Assistant Secretary of State to Act as Secretary of State	November 6, 1936	2337
1658	7488	Designation of Louis N. Robinson as Chairman of the Prison Industries Reorganization Board	November 12, 1936	
1659	7489	Enlarging Elk Refuge (Wyoming)	November 14, 1936	2159
1660	7490	Reservoir Site Restoration No. 16, Revoking in Part the Executive Order of June 8, 1926, Creating Reservoir Site Reserve No. 17	November 14, 1936	2160
1661	7491	Withdrawal of Public Lands for use of War Department as Target Range (Wyoming)	November 14, 1936	2160
1662	7492	Exemption of Albert F. Wood from Compulsory Retirement for Age	November 14, 1936	
1663	7493	Placing the Administrative Acts of the Puerto Rico Reconstruction Administration Under the Control and Supervision of the Secretary of the Interior Until Further Order	November 14, 1936	2160
1664	7494	Exemption of Davis B. Lewis from Compulsory Retirement for Age	November 14, 1936	
1665	7495	Designating Orange, Texas, as a Customs Port of Entry	November 14, 1936	2161
1666	7496	Transfer of Property, Functions, Funds, Etc., Pertaining to Recreational Demonstration Projects from the Resettlement Administration to the Secretary of the Interior	November 14, 1936	2243
1667	7497	Amending the Instructions to Diplomatic Officers and the Consular Regulations (Marriages of Foreign Service Officers)	November 17, 1936	2385
1668	7498	Authorizing the Alaska Railroad to Engage in Ocean-Going and Coastwise Transportation	November 17, 1936	2277
1669	7499	Excusing Federal Employees from Duty on December 24 and 26, 1936, and January 2, 1937	November 27, 1936	2471
1670	7500	Amending Executive Order No. 5952 of November 23, 1932, Relating to Army Ration	December 3, 1936	2471
1671	7501	Changing the Name of the Santa Barbara National Forest, California, to Los Padres National Forest	December 3, 1936	2471
1672	7502	Withdrawal of Public Land for Administrative Site (California)	December 3, 1936	2471
1673	7503	Amending and Correcting Description of Boundaries of Kuwaaohe Military Reservation, Hawaii	December 3, 1936	2472
1674	7504	Withdrawal of Public Land for Experiment Station (Arizona)	December 11, 1936	2481
1675	7505	Withdrawal of Public Lands (California)	December 11, 1936	2481
1676	7506	Revocation of Executive Orders No. 6122 of May 2, 1933, and No. 6266 of September 6, 1933, Withdrawing Public Lands (Colorado)	December 11, 1936	2482
1677	7507	Revocation of Executive Order No. 6075 of March 15, 1933, Withdrawing Public Lands (Colorado)	December 11, 1936	2482
1678	7508	Designating Carrabelle, Florida, as a Customs Port of Entry	December 11, 1936	2482
1679	7509	Establishing the Fort Peck Game Range (Montana)	December 11, 1936	2482
1680	7510	Establishing Lenore Lake Migratory Bird Refuge (Washington)	December 11, 1936	2483
1681	7511	Partial Revocation of Executive Order No. 5603 of April 20, 1931, Withdrawing Public Lands (Wyoming)	December 11, 1936	2484
1682	7512	Increasing the Amounts Available for Public Projects Under Clause (J) of the Emergency Relief Appropriation Act of 1936 (Amounts for Rural Rehabilitation, Etc.)	December 16, 1936	2495
1683	7513	Transfer of Lands from the Roosevelt and Pike National Forests to the Arapaho National Forest in the State of Colorado	December 16, 1936	2495
1684	7514	Establishing Patuxent Research Refuge (Maryland)	December 16, 1936	2495
1685	7515	Withdrawal of Public Land for Use of the War Department for the Enlargement of a Target Range (Arizona)	December 16, 1936	2497
1686	7516	Exemption of Elton A. Gongwer from Compulsory Retirement for Age	December 16, 1936	
1687	7517	Exemption of Andre Fourchy from Compulsory Retirement for Age	December 16, 1936	
1688	7518	Exemption of Frank E. Singleton from Compulsory Retirement for Age	December 16, 1936	
1689	7519	Exemption of Herbert A. Smith from Compulsory Retirement for Age	December 16, 1936	
1690	7520	Withdrawal of Public Land for Use of the War Department as a Target Range for the Arizona National Guard, Arizona	December 18, 1936	2511
1691	7521	Use of Vessels for Ice-Breaking Operations in Channels and Harbors	December 21, 1936	2527
1692	7522	Charles Sheldon Antelope Range, Nevada (Establishment)	December 21, 1936	2527
1693	7523	Hart Mountain Antelope Refuge - Oregon (Establishment)	December 21, 1936	2528
1694	7524	Establishing Chautauqua Migratory Waterfowl Refuge (Illinois)	December 23, 1936	2557
1695	7525	Exemption of Robert W. Shumate from Compulsory Retirement for Age	December 28, 1936	
1696	7526	Postponement of Effective Date of Certain Provisions of Executive Order No. 6166 of June 10, 1933 (Delaying Effect of Section 4 Relating to Disbursement Functions Until June 30, 1937)	December 29, 1936	
1697	7527	Modification of Executive Order No. 1030 of February 24, 1909, Reserving Public Lands for Educational and Agricultural Experiment Station Purposes (Alaska)	December 29, 1936	4
1698	7528	Revocation of Executive Order No. 5328 of April 15, 1930, Withdrawing Public Lands (Colorado)	December 29, 1936	4
1699	7529	Revocation of Executive Order No. 5343 of May 6, 1930, Withdrawing Public Lands (Nevada)	December 29, 1936	5
1700	7530	Transfer of the Functions, Funds, Property, Etc., of the Resettlement Administration to the Secretary of Agriculture	December 31, 1936	9
1701	7531	Exemption of Charles Earle from Compulsory Retirement for Age\	December 31, 1936	

=== 1937 ===
Relative No.	Absolute No.	Title / Description	Date signed	FR Citation
1702	7532	Establishing Shinnecock Migratory Bird Refuge, New York	January 8, 1937	63
1703	7533	Exemption of James E. Tibbitts From Compulsory Retirement for Age	January 11, 1937	
1704	7534	Excluding Land From Sitgreaves National Forest and Reserving it for Townsite Purposes, Arizona	January 12, 1937	87
1705	7535	Partial Revocation of Executive Order No. 6110 of May 2, 1933, Withdrawing Public Lands, California	January 12, 1937	88
1706	7536	Partial Revocation of Executive Order No. 5687 of August 18, 1931, Withdrawing Public Lands, Wyoming	January 12, 1937	88
1707	7537	Authorizing the Leasing of Certain Reserved Lands, Alaska	January 14, 1937	107
1708	7538	Enlarging the Delta Migratory Waterfowl Refuge, Louisiana	January 19, 1937	141
1709	7539	Partial Revocation of Executive Order No. 4914 of June 23, 1928, Withdrawing Public Lands, Wyoming	January 19, 1937	141
1710	7540	Revocation of Executive Order No. 6550 of January 6, 1934, Requiring Reports as to Allocation and Obligation of Emergency Funds	January 22, 1937	
1711	7541	Establishing Willapa Harbor Migratory Bird Refuge, Washington	January 22, 1937	168
1712	7542	Transfer of Certain Records of the Railroad Administration to the General Accounting Office, the Interstate Commerce Commission, and the United States Civil Service Commission	January 27, 1937	
1713	7543	Amendment of Instructions to Diplomatic Officers and of Consular Regulations	January 29, 1937	263
1714	7544	Withdrawal of Land for Forest Administrative Site, New Mexico	January 29, 1937	268
1715	7545	Exemption of William H. Ramsey From Compulsory Retirement for Age	January 29, 1937	
1716	7546	Transfer of Certain Property and Functions From the Department of Agriculture to the Department of the Interior	February 1, 1937	277
1717	7547	Amendment of Executive Order No. 6928 of December 24, 1934, Prescribing Regulations for Payment of Losses, etc.	February 1, 1937	
1718	7548	Enforcement of the Convention for Safety of Life at Sea, 1929	February 5, 1937	307
1719	7549	Designating Vessels To Patrol Waters Frequented by Seal Herds and Sea Otter	February 6, 1937	321
1720	7550	Revocation of Paragraph 9, Subdivision III, Schedule A, Civil Service Rules	February 10, 1937	345, 381
1721	7551	Amendment of Paragraph 1, Subdivision VI, Schedule A, Civil Service Rules	February 11, 1937	381
1722	7552	Exemption of William H. Long From Compulsory Retirement for Age	February 13, 1937	
1723	7553	Increasing Amounts Available for Public Projects Under Emergency Relief Appropriation Act of 1936	February 17, 1937	403
1724	7554	Amendment of Section 1 of Executive Order No. 7180 of September 6, 1935, Prescribing Rules and Regulations Governing the Making of Loans by the Puerto Rico Reconstruction Administration Under the Emergency Relief Appropriations Act of 1935	February 17, 1937	403
1725	7555	Withdrawal of Land for Forest Administrative Site, California	February 17, 1937	403
1726	7556	Excluding Certain Tracts of Land From Tongass National Forest and Restoring Them to Entry, Alaska	February 18, 1937	404
1727	7557	Amendment of Executive Order No. 7530 of December 31, 1936, Transferring Functions, Funds, Property, etc., of the Resettlement Administration to the Secretary of Agriculture	February 19, 1937	411
1728	7558	Withdrawal of Public Lands for Erosion Control Demonstrations, Nevada	February 23, 1937	434
1729	7559	Partial Revocation of Executive Order No. 5603 of April 20, 1931, Withdrawing Public Lands, Wyoming	February 23, 1937	434
1730	7560	Revocation of Executive Order No. 6082 of March 25, 1933, Withdrawing Public Lands, Wyoming	February 23, 1937	434
1731	7561	Partial Revocation of Executive Order No. 6288 of September 14, 1933, Withdrawing Public Lands, Wyoming	February 23, 1937	434
1732	7562	Establishing Sacramento Migratory Waterfowl Refuge, California	February 27, 1937	537
1733	7563	Establishing Swan Lake Migratory Waterfowl Refuge, Missouri	February 27, 1937	537
1734	7564	Extending the Limits of Customs Port of Entry of Saint Paul, Minnesota	February 27, 1937	537
1735	7565	Exemption of Joseph W. Austin From Compulsory Retirement for Age	February 27, 1937	
1736	7566	Exemption of William M. Beaman From Compulsory Retirement for Age	February 27, 1937	
1737	7567	Exemption of Charles J. Evans From Compulsory Retirement for Age	February 27, 1937	
1738	7568	Exemption of Clarence W. Perley From Compulsory Retirement for Age	February 27, 1937	
1739	7569	Exemption of Carl F. Jeansen From Compulsory Retirement for Age	March 3, 1937	
1740	7570	Modification of Executive Order No. 7070 of June 12, 1935, Prescribing Regulations Governing Appointments of Employees Paid from Emergency Funds	March 4, 1937	589
1741	7571	Exemption of John G. Honey From Compulsory Retirement for Age	March 6, 1937	
1742	7572	Modification of Executive Order No. 7513 of December 16, 1936, Transferring Lands from the Roosevelt and Pike National Forests to the Arapaho National Forest in Colorado	March 9, 1937	607
1743	7573	Designation the Honorable Adolph G. Wolff as Acting Judge of the District Court of the United States for Puerto Rico	March 9, 1937	607
1744	7574	Exemption of Edward M. Kennard From Compulsory Retirement for Age	March 9, 1937	
1745	7575	Limiting the Importation of Red Cedar Shingles From Canada	March 13, 1937	619
1746	7576	Restoring Lands to Territory of Hawaii for Road Purposes and Reserving Lands for Military Purposes, Schofield Barracks, Hawaii	March 15, 1937	629
1747	7577	Amending the Instructions to Diplomatic Officers and the Consular Regulations	March 19, 1937	671
1748	7578	Excluding Certain Tracts of Land From Tongrass National Forest and Restoring Them to Entry, Alaska	March 19, 1937	671
1749	7579	Partial Revocation of Executive Order No. 5165 of July 26, 1929, Withdrawing Public Land, Colorado	March 19, 1937	671
1750	7580	Exemption of Frank Hahn From Compulsory Retirement for Age	March 19, 1937	671
1751	7581	Exemption of Louis A. Simon From Compulsory Retirement for Age	March 19, 1937	
1752	7582	Exemption of George W. Hutchinson From Compulsory Retirement for Age	March 20, 1937	
1753	7583	Establishing Mud Lake Migratory Waterfowl Refuge, Minnesota	March 23, 1937	685
1754	7584	Designating Ajo, Arizona, as a Customs Port of Entry	March 24, 1937	685
1755	7585	Partial Revocation of Executive Order No. 6473 of December 4, 1933, Withdrawing Public Lands, Wyoming	March 24, 1937	685
1756	7586	Exemption of William Gerig From Compulsory Retirement for Age	March 24, 1937	
1757	7587	Authorizing Certain Employees of the National Labor Relations Board To Acquire a Competitive Classified Civil Service Status	March 27, 1937	719
1758	7588	Restoring to the Territory of Hawaii a Portion of the Fort Shafter Military Reservation	March 27, 1937	720
1759	7589	Partial Revocation of Executive Order No. 4914 of June 23, 1928, Withdrawing Public Lands, Wyoming	March 27, 1937	720
1760	7590	Partial Revocation of Executive Order No. 6119 of May 2, 1933, Withdrawing Public Lands, California	March 29, 1937	721
1761	7591	Exemption of Reinhardt Thiessen From Compulsory Retirement for Age	March 29, 1937	
1762	7592	Authorizing the Appointment of Mrs. Etta May Gilley to a Position in the Postal Service Without Regard to the Civil Service Rules	March 29, 1937	
1763	7593	Establishing Okefenokee Wildlife Refuge, Georgia	March 30, 1937	739
1764	7594	Establishing Jones Island Migratory Bird Refuge, Washington	March 30, 1937	739
1765	7595	Establishing Matia Island Migratory Bird Refuge, Washington	March 30, 1937	741
1766	7596	Withdrawal of Public Lands for Use of the War Department, Alaska	March 31, 1937	741
1767	7597	Exemption of Harry O. Bailey From Compulsory Retirement for Age	March 31, 1937	
1768	7598	Exemption of Harry M. Reynolds From Compulsory Retirement for Age	March 31, 1937	
1769	7599	Amendment of Executive Orders No. 6910 of November 26, 1934, as Amended, and No. 6964 of February 5, 1935, as Amended, Withdrawing Public Lands in Certain States	April 1, 1937	747
1770	7600	Amendment of Tariff of United States Consular Fees	April 7, 1937	795
1771	7601	Withdrawal of Public Lands to Provide Material for the Construction and Maintenance of Public Roads and Other Public Project, Oregon	April 7, 1937	795
1772	7602	Revocation of Executive Order No. 7261-A of December 31, 1935, Amending the Instruction to Diplomatic Officers of the United States	April 9, 1937	803
1773	7603	Partial Revocation of Executive Order No. 6795 of July 26, 1934, Withdrawing Public Lands, Wyoming	April 14, 1937	835
1774	7604	Partial Revocation of Executive Order No. 6473 of December 4, 1933, Withdrawing Public Lands, Wyoming	April 14, 1937	835
1775	7605	Revocation of Executive Order No. 6807 of August 4, 1934, and No. 6863 of October 3, 1934, Withdrawing Public Lands, New Mexico	April 15, 1937	839
1776	7606	Designating the Chairman of the United States Maritime Commission	April 16, 1937	839
1777	7607	Transfer of Lands from Dixie National Forest to Nevada National Forest, Nevada	April 19, 1937	851
1778	7608	Revocation of Executive Order No. 5596 of April 9, 1931, Withdrawing Public Lands, Nevada	April 22, 1937	885
1779	7609	Amendment of Executive Order No. 7070 of June 12, 1935, Prescribing Regulations Governing Appointments of Employees Paid From Emergency Funds	April 23, 1937	885
1780	7610	Amendment of Executive Order No. 6966 of February 8, 1935, Excluding Certain Tracts of Land From the Chugach National Forest and Restoring Them to Entry	April 23, 1937	885
1781	7611	Exemption of Harry C. Armstrong From Compulsory Retirement for Age	April 26, 1937	
1782	7612	Exemption of Charles H. Pierce From Compulsory Retirement for Age	April 26, 1937	
1783	7613	Exemption of James Robertson From Compulsory Retirement for Age	April 27, 1937	
1784	7614	Excluding Certain Tracts of Land From Tongass National Forest and Restoring Them to Entry	May 11, 1937	989
1785	7615	Revocation of Executive Order No. 6258 of August 22, 1933, Withdrawing Public Lands, New Mexico	May 13, 1937	997
1786	7616	Withdrawal of Public Lands for the Use of the Agriculture Department, Wyoming	May 13, 1937	997
1787	7617	Increasing the Amounts Available for Public Projects Under Clauses (F), (G), and (H) of the Emergency Relief Appropriation Act of 1936	May 13, 1937	997
1788	7618	Abolishing Vineyard Haven, Massachusetts, as a Customs Port of Entry	May 18, 1937	1021
1789	7619	Authorizing the Appointment of J.V. Taylor to the Position of Senior Soil Conservationist in the Soil Conservation Service, Department of Agriculture Without Regard to the Civil Service Rules	May 20, 1937	
1790	7620	Power Site Restoration No. 484, Revocation of Executive Order of June 8, 1909, Creating Temporary Power Site Withdrawal No. 17, and Partial Revocation of Executive Order of July 2, 1910, Creating Power Reserve No. 17	May 24, 1937	1069
1791	7621	Power-Site Restoration No. 485. Partial Revocation of Executive Order of March 31, 1911, Creating Power-Site Reserve No. 178	May 24, 1937	1069
1792	7622	Withdrawal of Public Land for the Use of the United States Indian Service Hospital, Alaska	May 29, 1937	1119
1793	7623	Withdrawal of Public Land for the Use of the Department of Agriculture as Addition to Agriculture Field Station, Oregon	May 29, 1937	1119
1794	7624	Enlarging the Tongass National Forest, Alaska	May 29, 1937	1119
1795	7625	Revocation of Executive Order No. 5144 of June 25, 1929, Withdrawing Public Lands	May 29, 1937	1119
1796	7626	Reinstatement of Former Foreign Service Officer - Robert F. Kelley, Class III	June 3, 1937	
1797	7627	Revocation of Executive Order No. 6120 of May 2, 1933, Withdrawing Public Lands, California	June 8, 1937	1191
1798	7628	Withdrawal of Public Lands, Arkansas	June 8, 1937	1191
1799	7629	Exemption of William T. Marshall From Compulsory Retirement for Age	June 8, 1937	
1800	7630	Authorizing the Extension of Appointments of Certain Employees of the General Accounting Office	June 8, 1937	
1801	7631	Power-Site Restoration No. 483. Partial Revocation of Executive Order of October 23, 1914, Creating Power-Site Reserve No. 451	June 9, 1937	1191
1802	7632	Certain Places Designated as Customs Ports of Entry	June 15, 1937	1245
1803	7633	Authorizing the Appointment of William B. Benham to a Classified Position in the Department of Justice Without Regard to Civil Service Rules	June 15, 1937	
1804	7634	Reinstatement of Certain Former Foreign Service Officers - Class V, John W. Bailey, Junior and George Gregg Fuller	June 16, 1937	
1805	7635	Exemption of Edward M. Weeks From Compulsory Retirement for Age	June 16, 1937	
1806	7636	Amendment of Executive Order No. 9 of January 17, 1873, Relating to the Holding of State or Local Offices by Federal Officers and Employees	June 17, 1937	1259
1807	7637	Exemption of John H. Thomas From Compulsory Retirement for Age, Interior Department	June 19, 1937	
1808	7638	Exemption of William F. Staley From Compulsory Retirement for Age	June 19, 1937	
1809	7639	Postponement of Effective Date of Certain Provisions of Executive Order No. 6166 of June 10, 1933	June 19, 1937	
1810	7640	Promulgating the Effective Date of the Code of Provided for the Bituminous Coal Act of 1937 and of Section 3 of Said Act	June 21, 1937	1265
1811	7641	Transferring to the Secretary of the Treasury the Functions Delegated to the Secretary of Labor by Executive Order No. 2889 of June 18, 1918	June 22, 1937	1295
1812	7642	Exemption of Burton Smith From Compulsory Retirement for Age	June 22, 1937	
1813	7643	Establishing Bombay Hook Migratory Waterfowl Refuge, Delaware	June 22, 1937	1305
1814	7644	Authorizing Transfer of Certain Employees of the Government-Operated Star Route Service Bureau, Post Office Department, to Positions in the Postal Service	June 23, 1937	
1815	7645	Exemption of George G. Hedgcock From Compulsory Retirement for Age	June 24, 1937	
1816	7646	Exemption of Hoffman Philip From Compulsory Retirement for Age	June 28, 1937	
1817	7647	Withdrawal of Public Land for Use as a Rifle Range Under the Supervision of the War Department, Idaho	June 28, 1937	1315
1818	7648	Waving Provisions of Executive Order No. 9 of January 17, 1873, Prohibiting Federal Employees from Holding any Office Under any State, Territorial or Municipal Government, as to Douglas Armstrong, Director of Police, Virgin Islands	June 28, 1937	
1819	7649	Making Applicable to the Emergency Relief Appropriations Act of 1937 Certain Executive Orders, Rules, and Regulations Issued Under Authority of the Emergency Relief Appropriation Acts of 1935 and 1936	June 29, 1937	1359
1820	7650	Establishing Moosehorn Migratory Bird Refuge, Maine	July 1, 1937	1377
1821	7651	Modifying Executive Order of June 8, 1926, Creating Reservoir Site Reserve No. 17, Pacific Slope Basins, California	July 1, 1937	1379, 1581
1822	7652	Partial Revocation of Executive Order No. 6361 of October 25, 1933, Withdrawing Public Lands, California	July 2, 1937	1379
1823	7653	Revocation of Executive Order No. 5603 of April 20, 1931, Withdrawing Public Lands, Wyoming	July 9, 1937	1419
1824	7654	Authorizing the Appointment of Jacob Oblock to the Position of Elevator Operator in the Custodial Service, Post Office Department, Without Regard to the Civil Service Rules	July 9, 1937	
1825	7655	Establishing Deer Flat Migratory Waterfowl Refuge, Idaho	July 12, 1937	1453, 1665
1826	7656	Modification of Executive Order of June 8, 1929, Creating Potash Reserve No. 7, New Mexico	July 13, 1937	1461
1827	7657	Exemption of George C. DeHart From Compulsory Retirement for Age	July 14, 1937	
1828	7658	Restoring to the Territory of Hawaii a Portion of the Fort De Russy Military Reservation	July 15, 1937	1475
1829	7659	Exemption of Walter B. Luna From Compulsory Retirement for Age	July 15, 1937	
1830	7660	Exempting Certain Positions From Salary Classification	July 17, 1937	1497
1831	7661	Amendment of Subdivision XI, Schedule B, Civil Service Rules	July 17, 1937	1497
1832	7662	Withdrawal of Public Lands for the Use of the Department of Agriculture, Arkansas	July 17, 1937	1497
1833	7663	Enlarging Uinta National Forest, Utah	July 17, 1937	1498, 1641
1834	7664	Modifying the Seney Migratory Waterfowl Refuge, Michigan	July 17, 1937	1499
1835	7665	Correcting Descriptions of Boundaries of Kawaihae Lighthouse Reservation, Territory of Hawaii	July 17, 1937	1499
1836	7666	Exemption of Albert F. Woods From Compulsory Retirement for Age	July 17, 1937	
1837	7667	Exemption of William H. Griffin From Compulsory Retirement for Age	July 17, 1937	
1838	7668	Reinstatement of Foreign Service Officer, George T. Summerlin, Class I	July 19, 1937	
1839	7669	Withdrawal of Public Lands for the Use of the Department of Agriculture, Colorado	July 19, 1937	1509
1840	7670	Withdrawal of Public Lands for the Use of the Department of Agriculture, Arkansas	July 19, 1937	1509
1841	7671	Withdrawal of Public Lands for the Use of the Department of Agriculture, South Dakota	July 19, 1937	1510, 1622
1842	7672	Withdrawal of Public Lands for the Use of the Department of Agriculture, Oregon	July 19, 1937	1511, 1622
1843	7673	Withdrawal of Public Lands for the Use of the Department of Agriculture, North Dakota	July 19, 1937	1512
1844	7674	Withdrawal of Public Lands for the Use of the Department of Agriculture, North Dakota	July 19, 1937	1512, 1622
1845	7675	Withdrawal of Public Lands for the Use of the Department of Agriculture, New Mexico	July 19, 1937	1535
1846	7676	The Canal Zone Judiciary	July 26, 1937	1579
1847	7677	Withdrawal of Public Lands for the Use of the Department of Agriculture, Colorado	July 27, 1937	1581
1848	7677-A	Civilian Conservation Corps	July 26, 1937	1605
1849	7678	Establishing Apache Migratory Waterfowl Refuge, Arizona	July 27, 1937	1581
1850	7679	Amendment of Subdivision II, Schedule A of the Civil Service Rules	July 30, 1937	1621
1851	7680	Enlarging the Elk Refuge, Wyoming	July 30, 1937	1621
1852	7681	Establishing the Turnbull Migratory Waterfowl Refuge, Washington	July 30, 1937	1622
1853	7682	Exemption of Milton F. Colburn From Compulsory Retirement for Age	July 30, 1937	
1854	7683	Revocation of Executive Order No. 6192 of July 3, 1933, Withdrawing Public Lands, California	August 5, 1937	1641
1855	7684	Revocation of Executive Order No. 6288 of September 14, 1933, Withdrawing Public Lands, Wyoming	August 5, 1937	1641
1856	7685	Revocation of Executive Order No. 4699 of August 1, 1927, Withdrawing Public Lands, California	August 5, 1937	1641
1857	7686	Amendment of Executive Order No. 7302 of February 21, 1936, Transferring Certain Lands in the Virgin Islands to the Control and Jurisdiction of the Secretary of the Navy	August 5, 1937	1641
1858	7687	Extending the Provisions of the Civil Service Retirement Act to Certain Federal Employees on the Isthmus of Panama	August 10, 1937	1665
1859	7688	Amendment of Executive Order No. 3206 of December 30, 1919, as Amended, Creating the Federal Board of Surveys and Maps	August 10, 1937	1665
1860	7689	Appointment of Secretary of the Interior as Administrator of the Puerto Rico Reconstruction Administration	August 12, 1937	1679
1861	7690	Exemption of Stephen B. Soulé From Compulsory Retirement for Age	August 13, 1937	
1862	7691	Establishing the Snake River Migratory Waterfowl Refuge, Idaho	August 17, 1937	1701
1863	7692	Exemption of Robert C. Merritt From Compulsory Retirement for Age	August 17, 1937	
1864	7693	Withdrawal of Public Lands for the Use of the Department of Agriculture, Washington	August 19, 1937	1713
1865	7694	Revocation of Executive Order No. 5667 of August 18, 1931, Withdrawing Public Lands, Wyoming	August 23, 1937	1727
1866	7695	Withdrawal of Public Lands for the Use of the War Department for Military Purposes, Washington	August 23, 1937	1727
1867	7696	Regulations Governing the Grades and Ratings of Enlisted Men of the Regular Army for the Fiscal Year 1938	August 23, 1937	1727
1868	7697	Interchange of Land Between the Army and the Navy at Bolling Field, District of Columbia	August 23, 1937	1727
1869	7698	Excluding Certain Lands From the Carson National Forest, New Mexico	August 26, 1937	2071
1870	7699	Abolishing Nome, Alaska, as a Customs Port of Entry	August 28, 1937	2093
1871	7700	Excusing Federal Employees from Duty on September 17, 1937	August 31, 1937	2103
1872	7700-A	Inspection of Income, Profit, and Capital Stock Tax Returns by the Committee on Interstate Commerce, U.S. Senate	August 31, 1937	2215
1873	7701	Limiting the Importation of Red Cedar Shingles from Canada During the Last Six Months of 1937	September 3, 1937	2113
1874	7702	Amendment of Paragraph 6, Subdivision IX, Schedule A of Civil Service Rules (Office of Secretary of Agriculture)	September 6, 1937	2139
1875	7703	Designation of Joanne Kavanagh To Sign Land Patents	September 10, 1937	2147
1876	7704	Exemption of George C. Havenner From Compulsory Retirement for Age	September 10, 1937	
1877	7705	Public Water Reserve No. 159, California	September 11, 1937	2167
1878	7706	Extending the Limits of Customs Port of Entry of Chester, Pennsylvania	September 11, 1937	2167
1879	7707	Withdrawal of Public Land for Use of the War Department for Military Purposes, California	September 11, 1937	2167
1880	7708	Exempting Roger John Traynor From the Provisions of the Executive Order No. 9 of January 17, 1873	September 11, 1937	2167
1881	7709	Exemption of Lee C. Corbett From Compulsory Retirement for Age	September 16, 1937	
1882	7709-A	Abolishing the National Emergency Council	September 16, 1937	2195
1883	7710	Authorizing the Appointment of Dr. Winfred Overholser as Superintendent of St. Elizabeths Hospital Without Regard to Civil Service Rules	September 17, 1937	2195
1884	7711	Designating John D. Biggers Administrator of an Unemployment Census	September 22, 1937	2221
1885	7712	Amending the Tariff of United States Consular Fees	September 23, 1937	2281
1886	7713	Establishing Lake Thibadeau Migratory Waterfowl Refuge, Montana	September 23, 1937	2281
1887	7714	Exemption of Charles R. Torbet From Compulsory Retirement for Age	September 23, 1937	
1888	7715	Prescribing Regulations for Carrying Into Effect in the Virgin Islands Certain Provisions of the Marijuana Tax Act of 1937	September 26, 1937	2347
1889	7716	Extension of Trust Periods on Indian Lands Expiring During Calendar Year 1938	September 29, 1937	2417
1890	7717	Amending Executive Order No. 7677-A, of July 26, 1937, Entitled Civilian Conservation Corps	September 29, 1937	2435
1891	7718	Authorizing the Inspection of Certain Income Tax Returns by the Department of National Revenue, Ottawa, Canada	October 2, 1937	2435
1892	7719	Enlarging Ouachita National Forest, Arkansas	October 8, 1937	2465
1893	7720	Establishing Camas Migratory Waterfowl Refuge, Idaho	October 8, 1937	2465
1894	7721	Enlarging Willapa Harbor Migratory Bird Refuge, Washington	October 8, 1937	2465
1895	7722	Withdrawal of Public Land for the Use, Possession, and Control of the Tennessee Valley Authority, Alabama	October 8, 1937	2466
1896	7723	Withdrawing Public Land for Classification, New Mexico	October 8, 1937	2466
1897	7724	Establishing Bitter Lake Migratory Waterfowl Refuge, New Mexico	October 8, 1937	2467
1898	7725	Exemption of Matthew J. Munster From Compulsory Retirement for Age	October 12, 1937	
1899	7726	Exemption of George T. Summerlin From Compulsory Retirement for Age	October 12, 1937	
1900	7727	Exemption of Harry D. Myers From Compulsory Retirement for Age	October 12, 1937	
1901	7728	Exemption of Miss Mary M. O'Reilly From Compulsory Retirement for Age	October 14, 1937	
1902	7729	Amending the Instructions to Diplomatic Officers and the Consular Regulations	October 16, 1937	2601
1903	7730	Exemption of Marvin M. McLean From Compulsory Retirement for Age	October 19, 1937	
1904	7731	Designating the Honorable Martin Travieso as Acting Judge of the District Court of the United States for Puerto Rico for the Trial of the Case United States v. Julio Pinto Gandia, et al.	October 22, 1937	2631
1905	7732	Transferring to the United States Housing Authority Federal Housing Projects, Funds, Property and Employees of the Federal Emergency Administration of Public Works	October 27, 1937	2707
1906	7733	Exemption of Robert Dickens From Compulsory Retirement for Age, Navy Yard	October 27, 1937	
1907	7733-A	Exemption of Margaret M. Hanna From Compulsory Retirement for Age	October 27, 1937	
1908	7734	Withdrawal of Public Land for the Use of the Department of Agriculture, New Mexico	November 1, 1937	2803
1909	7735	Exemption of Mrs. Olive H. Jarrett From Compulsory Retirement for Age	November 5, 1937	
1910	7736	Amendment of Executive Order No. 9 of January 17, 1873, To Permit Any Officer or Employee of the Municipality of St. Thomas and St. John or the Municipality of St. Croix, Virgin Islands, To Be Appointed as Immigration Inspector for the Virgin Islands	November 6, 1937	2819
1911	7737	Authorizing the Appointment of Mrs. Mary G. Bird to a Position in the Farm Credit Administration Without Regard to Civil Service Rules	November 6, 1937	
1912	7738	Amendment of Paragraph 6, Subdivision VII, Schedule A, Civil Service Rules	November 11, 1937	2867
1913	7739	Revocation of Executive Order No. 6752 of June 28, 1934, Amending Subdivision XVIII of Schedule A of the Civil Service Rules	November 15, 1937	2895
1914	7740	Withdrawal of Public Land for Use of the War Department for Military Purposes, California	November 15, 1937	2895
1915	7741	Reservoir Site Restoration No. 17 Partial Revocation of Executive Order of June 8, 1926, Creating Reservoir Site Reserve No. 17, California	November 15, 1937	2896
1916	7742	Enlarging Tongass National Forest, Alaska	November 19, 1937	2935
1917	7743	Transferring the Control and Jurisdiction Over Lands in Dona Ana County, New Mexico, From the Department of Agriculture to the Department of the Interior	November 19, 1937	2935
1918	7744	Authorizing the Solicitor of the Department of Labor To Act as Secretary of Labor	November 19, 1937	2935
1919	7745	Exemption of Arthur Snow from Compulsory Retirement for Age	November 19, 1937	
1920	7746	Amending Paragraph 7, Subdivision I, Schedule A of the Civil Service Rules	November 20, 1937	2947
1921	7747	Establishing a Defensive Sea Area Off the Coast of San Clemente Island, California	November 20, 1937	2947
1922	7748	Withdrawal of Area for Use of the Navy Department for Present and Prospective Naval Purposes, Alaska	November 20, 1937	2947
1923	7749	Enlarging St. Marks Migratory Bird Refuge, Florida	November 22, 1937	2947
1924	7750	Exemption of Adrian J. Pieters From Compulsory Retirement for Age	November 23, 1937	
1925	7751	Exemption of Wendell W. Mischler From Compulsory Retirement for Age	November 23, 1937	
1926	7752	Transferring Certain Lands from the Department of Agriculture to the Department of Commerce and Reserving Them as the Arcadia Fish Hatchery	November 24, 1937	2957
1927	7753	Exemption of Frank L. Boyd From Compulsory Retirement for Age	November 26, 1937	
1928	7754	Exemption of Luther S. Cannon From Compulsory Retirement for Age	November 26, 1937	
1929	7755	Exemption of Charles H. Hastings from Compulsory Retirement for Age	November 26, 1937	
1930	7756	Delegating to the Secretary of the Interior Certain Powers and Functions Vested in the President by the Act of February 22, 1935, Ch. 18, 49 Stat. 30, as Amended, and Authorizing the Establishment of a Petroleum Conservation Division	December 1, 1937	3091
1931	7757	Regulations Under the Act of February 22, 1935 as Amended by the Act of June 14, 1937	December 1, 1937	3091
1932	7758	Constituting Designated Area, and Establishing Federal Tender Board No. 1	December 1, 1937	3096
1933	7759	Revoking Executive Order Nos. 7024-B and 7129-A	December 1, 1937	3097
1934	7760	Withdrawal of Public Lands for the Use of the Department of Agriculture	December 3, 1937	3107
1935	7761	Extending Limits of Customs Port of Entry of Wilmington, North Carolina	December 3, 1937	3107
1936	7762	Exemption of John W. Woermann From Compulsory Retirement for Age	December 3, 1937	
1937	7763	Excusing Federal Employees from Duty on December 24, 1937	December 6, 1937	3115
1938	7764	Establishing the Sabine Migratory Waterfowl Refuge, Louisiana	December 6, 1937	3183
1939	7765	Restoring Certain Lands to the Control of the Secretary of the Interior, Washington	December 6, 1937	3184
1940	7766	Amendment of Executive Order No. 6928 of December 24, 1934, as Amended	December 10, 1937	
1941	7767	Extending the Limits of the Customs Port of Entry of Buffalo, New York	December 11, 1937	3213
1942	7768	Revocation of Executive Order No. 6124 of May 2, 1933, Withdrawing Public Lands, Colorado	December 11, 1937	3213
1943	7769	Exemption of Walter H. Beal From Compulsory Retirement for Age	December 13, 1937	
1944	7770	Establishing Hazen Bay Migratory Waterfowl Refuge, Alaska	December 14, 1937	3279
1945	7771	Excluding Certain Tracts of Land From Tongass National Forest and Restoring Them to Entry, Alaska	December 14, 1937	3279
1946	7772	Revocation of Executive Order No. 5711 of September 14, 1931, Withdrawing Land for Classification and in Aid of Legislation, Montana	December 14, 1937	3279
1947	7773	Modification of Executive Order No. 6957 of February 4, 1935, Withdrawing Certain Public Lands, Alaska	December 21, 1937	3415
1948	7774	Postponement of Effective Date of Certain Provisions of Executive Order No. 6166 of June 10, 1933	December 21, 1937	
1949	7775	Transferring Certain Lands From the Department of Agriculture to the Department of Commerce and Reserving them as the McKinney Lake Fish Hatchery, North Carolina	December 27, 1937	3431
1950	7776	Modification of Executive Order No. 7709-A of September 16, 1937, Abolishing the National Emergency Council	December 27, 1937	3437
1951	7777	Exemption of Charles Earle from Compulsory Retirement for Age	December 28, 1937	
1952	7778	Waiver of the Examination Requirements of Civil Service Rule IX To Permit the Appointment of Bernard J. Kinnahan to a Classified Position in the Post Office Department	December 28, 1937	
1953	7779	Amendment of Executive Order No. 5643 of June 8, 1931, Prescribing Regulations Governing Representation and Post Allowances	December 28, 1937	
1954	7780	Establishing the Lacassine Migratory Waterfowl Refuge, Louisiana	December 30, 1937	1
1955	7781	Amending Executive Order No. 5517 of December 17, 1930, Excluding a Tract of Land From the Chugach National Forest, Alaska	December 30, 1937	1
1956	7782	Exemption of Harry C. Dorsey From Compulsory Retirement for Age	December 30, 1937	
1957	7783	Modifying Executive Order No. 1919½ of April 21, 1914, and Setting Apart Certain Lands for the Use of the Alaska Road Commission for Aviation Field Purposes, Alaska	December 31, 1937	13
1958	7784	Establishing the Aransas Migratory Waterfowl Refuge, Texas	December 31, 1937	

=== 1938 ===
Relative No.	Absolute No.	Title / Description	Date signed	FR Citation
1959	7784-A	Designating the Architect of the Capitol as a Member of the Alley Dwelling Authority	January 5, 1938	65
1960	7785	Amendment of Executive Order No. 6928 of December 24, 1934	January 8, 1938	
1961	7786	Amendment of Executive Order No. 4601 of March 1, 1927, Prescribing Regulations Pertaining to the Award of the Distinguished Flying Cross	January 8, 1938	49
1962	7787	Power-Site Restoration No. 487. Partial Revocation of Executive Order of June 8, 1909, Creating Temporary Power-Site Withdrawal No. 20 and Executive Order of July 2, 1910, Creating Power-Site Reserve No. 20, Montana	January 10, 1938	63
1963	7788	Exemption of Joseph J. McGuigan from Compulsory Retirement for Age	January 11, 1938	
1964	7789	Exemption of David H. Hahn from Compulsory Retirement for Age	January 11, 1938	
1965	7790	Amendment of Executive Order No. 7302 of February 21, 1936, Transferring Certain Lands to the Control and Jurisdiction of the Secretary of the Navy, Virgin Islands	January 12, 1938	99
1966	7791	Exemption of Edward B. Russ from Compulsory Retirement for Age	January 13, 1938	
1967	7792	Transfer of Jurisdiction Over Certain Lands From the Secretary of Agriculture to the Secretary of the Interior, New Mexico	January 18, 1938	161
1968	7793	Partial Revocation of Executive Order No. 6644 of March 14, 1934, Withdrawal of Public Lands, Colorado	January 20, 1938	225
1969	7794	Correcting Description of Parcel of Land Contained in Executive Order No. 6050 of February 27, 1933	January 20, 1938	225
1970	7795	Establishing the Huron Migratory Bird Refuge, Michigan	January 21, 1938	225
1971	7796	Amending Executive Order No. 9 of January 17, 1873 to Permit Certain Employees of Department of the Interior to Hold State, Territorial, and Municipal Offices, etc.	January 21, 1938	226
1972	7797	Documents Required of Bona Fide Alien Seamen Entering the United States	January 26, 1938	253
1973	7798	Transferring a Portion of the Boise Barracks Military Reservation, Idaho, to the Control and Jurisdiction of the Veteran's Administration	January 26, 1938	253
1974	7799	Enlarging Lower Souris Migratory Waterfowl Refuge, North Dakota	January 27, 1938	261
1975	7800	Transferring Certain Lands to the Control and Jurisdiction of the Secretary of the Navy, Cuba	January 27, 1938	262
1976	7801	Establishing Black Coulee Migratory Waterfowl Refuge, Montana	January 28, 1938	271
1977	7802	Exemption of Nathan C. Grover from Compulsory Retirement for Age	January 29, 1938	
1978	7803	Withdrawing Public Land for Forest Lookout Station, Washington	February 2, 1938	307
1979	7804	Reserving Public Land for the Use of the Lighthouse Service, Department of Commerce, Hawaii	February 2, 1938	307
1980	7805	Correcting Description of Lands Contained in Executive Order No. 6897 of November 7, 1934	February 5, 1938	327
1981	7806	Fort William D. Davis Military Reservation	February 5, 1938	327
1982	7807	Power-Site Restoration No. 486, Oregon. Partial Revocation of Executive Order of April 28, 1917, Creating Power-Site Reserve No. 621	February 8, 1938	379
1983	7808	Power-Site Restoration No. 488, Oregon. Partial Revocation of Executive Order of December 12, 1917, Creating Power-Site Reserve No. 661	February 8, 1938	379
1984	7809	Amending Paragraph 13, Subdivision III, Schedule A of the Civil Service Rules	February 8, 1938	379
1985	7810	Revoking the Establishment of Baird Fish Hatchery on McCloud River, California	February 8, 1938	379
1986	7811	Amendment of Regulation VIII of Regulations Governing Appointment of Unclassified Laborers	February 9, 1938	393
1987	7812	Revocation of Executive Order No. 6179 of June 16, 1933, Withdrawing Public Lands	February 14, 1938	443
1988	7813	Amendment of Rule 16 of Executive Order No. 4314 of September 25, 1925, Establishing Rules Governing Navigation of the Panama Canal and Adjacent Waters	February 14, 1938	443
1989	7814	Partial Revocation of Executive Order No. 4430 of April 23, 1926, as Modified Withdrawing Public Lands	February 15, 1938	447
1990	7815	Amending Paragraph 10(a), Subdivision IV, Schedule A of the Civil Service Rules	February 15, 1938	447
1991	7816	Transferring Portions of Amaknak Island to Control and Jurisdiction of the Secretary of the Navy, Alaska	February 15, 1938	448
1992	7817	Designating Honorable Martin Travieso as Acting Judge of the District Court of the United States of Puerto Rico	February 16, 1938	489
1993	7818	Designating Port St. Joe as a Customs Port of Entry, Florida	February 17, 1938	503
1994	7819	Exemption of George W. Patterson from Compulsory Retirement Age, U.S. Naval Power Factory	February 17, 1938	
1995	7820	Exemption of Dr. J. Davis Bradfield from Compulsory Retirement for Age	February 17, 1938	
1996	7821	Designating Emory S. Land as Chairman of the United States Maritime Commission	February 18, 1938	503
1997	7822	Limiting the Importation of Red Cedar Shingles From Canada During the First Six Months of 1938	February 25, 1938	547
1998	7823	Amending the Order to Permit Joseph M. Watkins to Hold a Federal and State Office	February 25, 1938	
1999	7824	Exemption of Louis A. Simon from Compulsory Retirement for Age	February 25, 1938	
2000	7825	Exemption of Harry H. Little from Compulsory Retirement for Age	February 26, 1938	
2001	7826	Amendment of the Consular Regulations	February 28, 1938	561
2002	7827	Appointing Thomas D. Quinn Administrative Assistant to the Attorney General Without Regard to Civil Service Rules	March 2, 1938	
2003	7828	Placing Certain Islands in the Pacific Ocean Under the Control and Jurisdiction of the Secretary of the Interior	March 3, 1938	609
2004	7829	Revocation of Executive Order No. 5428 of August 20, 1930, Withdrawing Land for Classification and in Aid of Legislation	March 7, 1938	641
2005	7830	Partial Revocation of Executive Order No. 5341 of May 2, 1930, Withdrawing Public Lands	March 7, 1938	641
2006	7831	Amendment of Executive Order No. 7293 of February 14, 1936, Prescribing Regulations Concerning the Granting of Allowances for Quarters and Subsistence to Enlisted Men	March 7, 1938	641
2007	7832	Revocation of Executive Order No. 5923 of September 20, 1932, Withdrawing of Public Lands	March 7, 1938	641
2008	7833	Establishing the Hewitt Lake Migratory Waterfowl Refuge, Montana	March 7, 1938	641
2009	7834	Exemption of Charles W. Franks from Compulsory Retirement for Age	March 8, 1938	
2010	7835	Revocation of Executive Order No. 2184 of April 27, 1915, Withdrawing Public Lands	March 11, 1938	655
2011	7836	Public Water Restoration No. 80	March 11, 1938	655
2012	7837	Cash Relief for Certain Employees of the Panama Canal	March 12, 1938	667
2013	7838	Establishment of a Supply Fund for the Works Progress Administration, Supply Fund for the Procurement, Distribution, and Use of Materials, Supplies, and Equipment for Projects Under the Emergency Relief Appropriation Act of 1937	March 12, 1938	667
2014	7839	Transferring Certain Housing or Slum-Clearance Projects to the Puerto Rico Reconstruction Administration	March 12, 1938	668
2015	7840	Extending the Limits of the Customs Port of Entry of Philadelphia, Pennsylvania	March 15, 1938	687
2016	7841	Withdrawal of Public Lands for Use of the Alaska Railroad, Alaska	March 15, 1938	687
2017	7842	Exemption of James Robertson From Compulsory Retirement for Age	March 15, 1938	
2018	7843	Exemption of William J. Marlee from Compulsory Retirement for Age	March 16, 1938	
2019	7844	Exemption of John G. Honey from Compulsory Retirement for Age	March 18, 1938	
2020	7845	Prescribing Regulations Relating to Annual Leave of Government Employees	March 21, 1938	715
2021	7846	Prescribing Regulations Relating to Sick Leave of Government Employees	March 21, 1938	717
2022	7847	Withdrawal of Public Lands for Use of the Navy Department	March 21, 1938	719
2023	7848	Designating the Secretary of the Treasury as the Official to Receive Certain Capital Stock From the Reconstruction Finance Corporation, the Secretary of Agriculture, and the Governor of the Farm Credit Administration	March 22, 1938	739
2024	7849	Authorizing the Inspection of Income, Excess Profits and Capital Stock Tax Returns, Estate and Gift Tax Returns Filed After June 16, 1933, and Returns Under Title IX of the Social Security Act	March 25, 1938	751
2025	7850	Revocation of Executive Order No. 6087 of March 28, 1933, Withdrawing Public Lands	March 26, 1938	751
2026	7851	Designation of Charles V. McLaughlin as Member of Interdepartmental Committee to Coordinate Health and Welfare Activities	March 26, 1938	
2027	7852	Amending Paragraph 5, Subdivision XI, Schedule A of the Civil Service Rules	March 29, 1938	777
2028	7853	Amending Paragraph 4, Subdivision III, Schedule B of the Civil Service Rules	March 29, 1938	777
2029	7854	Revocation of Executive Order No. 6055 of February 28, 1933, Withdrawing Public Lands	March 30, 1938	799
2030	7855	Partial Revocation of Executive Order No. 5089 of April 9, 1929, Withdrawing Public Lands for Classification and in Aid of Proposed Legislation	March 30, 1938	799
2031	7856	Rules Governing the Granting and Issuing of Passports in the United States	March 31, 1938	799
2032	7857	Transferring to the People of Puerto Rico Certain Lands No Longer Needed for the Purposes of the United States	March 31, 1938	806
2033	7858	Authorizing the Attorney General to Reject Bids for Certain Property Offered for Sale at Savannah, Georgia, Pursuant to the Trading With the Enemy Act, as Amended	March 31, 1938	806
2034	7859	Exemption of Edward M. Kennard from Compulsory Retirement for Age	April 5, 1938	
2035	7860	Reservation of Land for River and Harbor Purposes, Minnesota	April 6, 1938	855
2036	7861	Exemption of Clarence E. Alderman From Compulsory Retirement for Age	April 6, 1938	
2037	7862	Modification of Executive Order No. 7387 of June 15, 1936, Reserving Naval Station, Balboa, Canal Zone	April 7, 1938	863
2038	7863	Exemption of Frank B. Bourn From Compulsory Retirement for Age	April 7, 1938	
2039	7864	Establishing Pea Island Migratory Waterfowl Refuge; North Carolina	April 8, 1938	863
2040	7865	Documents Required of Aliens Entering the United States	April 12, 1938	885
2041	7866	Withdrawal of Public Land for Use of the Department of Agriculture; Arkansas	April 14, 1938	899
2042	7867	Withdrawal of Public Land for Use of the Department of Agriculture; Louisiana	April 15, 1938	903
2043	7868	Transfer of Jurisdiction Over Certain Lands From the Secretary of Agriculture to the Secretary of the Interior	April 15, 1938	903
2044	7869	Inspection of Income, Excess-Profits, and Capital Stock Tax Returns by the Special Committee to Investigate Lobbying Activities, United States Senate	April 18, 1938	921
2045	7870	Revocation of Executive Order No. 3345 of October 23, 1920, Withdrawing Public Lands for National Monument Classification; Arizona	April 19, 1938	931
2046	7871	Exemption of Thomas G. Shearman From Compulsory Retirement for Age	April 19, 1938	
2047	7872	Amendment of Subdivision I, Schedule B, Civil Service Rules	April 20, 1938	939
2048	7873	Exemption of Edwin C. E. Lord From Compulsory Retirement for Age	April 21, 1938	
2049	7874	Waiver of Time Limitations Contained in Civil Service Rule IX to Permit the Reinstatement of Mrs. Jessie Scott Arnold to a Position in the Classified Service	April 22, 1938	
2050	7875	Transferring Certain Land to the Control and Jurisdiction of the Treasury Department; New Mexico	April 22, 1938	965
2051	7876	Exemption of Charles J. Carlton From Compulsory Retirement for Age	April 22, 1938	
2052	7877	Revocation of Executive Order No. 6814, Dated August 9, 1934, and Executive Order No. 6895-A, Dated November 2, 1934	April 28, 1938	998
2053	7878	Amending Paragraph 7, Subdivision III, Schedule A of the Civil Service Rules	April 29, 1938	1005
2054	7879	Amending Section 6 of Executive Order No. 7845 of March 21, 1938, Prescribing Regulations Relating to Annual Leave of Government Employees	May 9, 1938	1075
2055	7880	Amending Section 9 of Executive Order No. 7846 of March 21, 1938, Prescribing Regulations Relating to Sick Leave of Government Employees	May 9, 1938	1075
2056	7881	Power Site Restoration No. 489, Partial Revocation of Executive Order of June 30, 1916, Creating Power Site Reserve No. 533; Washington	May 9, 1938	1084
2057	7882	Establishing the Tybee Migratory Bird Refuge; Georgia	May 9, 1938	1084
2058	7883	Withdrawal of Public Lands to Provide Material for the Construction and Maintenance of Public Roads and Other Public Projects; California	May 9, 1938	1085
2059	7884	Reestablishing the Toiyabe National Forest; Nevada	May 9, 1938	1085
2060	7885	Placing Certain Land Under the Control and Jurisdiction of the Secretary of the Treasury; Alaska	May 11, 1938	1099
2061	7886	Revocation of Executive Order No. 4061 of August 12, 1924, and Partial Revocation of Executive Order No. 4844 of March 23, 1928, Withdrawing Public Lands; New Mexico	May 16, 1938	1131
2062	7887	Extending the Provisions of the Civil Service Retirement Act to Employees Appointed Under Authority of Section 10 of Civil Service Rule II	May 16, 1938	1131
2063	7888	Withdrawal of Public Land for Classification, Etc.; Alaska	May 16, 1938	1131
2064	7889	Revocation of Executive Order No. 7520 of December 18, 1936, Withdrawing Lands for Use of the War Department as a Target Range for the Arizona National Guard; Arizona	May 16, 1938	1131
2065	7890	Exemption of Stanley Searles From Compulsory Retirement for Age	May 16, 1938	
2066	7891	Restoring Certain Lands to the Territory of Hawaii for Highway Purposes	May 18, 1938	1159
2067	7892	Exemption of George F. Bowerman From Compulsory Retirement for Age	May 18, 1938	
2068	7893	Restoring Land to Territory of Hawaii for Aeronautical Purposes and Reserving Land for Military Purposes; Territory of Hawaii	May 21, 1938	1177
2069	7894	Delegating Certain Powers to the Attorney General Under the Trading With the Enemy Act	May 23, 1938	1189
2070	7895	Enlarging the Hart Mountain Antelope Refuge; Oregon	May 23, 1938	1189
2071	7896	Amendment of Executive Order No. 9 of January 17, 1873, to Permit Officers and Employees of the Police or Prison Departments of the Territorial and Municipal Governments of the Virgin Islands to Be Appointed as Deputies or Employees in the Office of the United States Marshal for the Virgin Islands	May 24, 1938	1199
2072	7897	Partial Revocation of the Executive Order No. 5894 of July 26, 1932, Withdrawing Public Lands; Colorado	May 24, 1938	1199
2073	7898	Withdrawal of Public Land Authorities to Be Added to the Yosemite National Park; California	May 26, 1938	1224
2074	7899	Authorizing the Appointment of Miss Amy G. Maher to a Position on the Social Security Board Without Regard to Civil Service Rules	May 26, 1938	
2075	7900	Designating John Monroe Johnson and Richard C. Patterson, Jr., to Act as Secretary of Commerce	May 28, 1938	
2076	7901	Authorizing the Attorney General to Sell Upon Public Exchanges Without Prior Advertisement Certain Property Held Under the Trading With the Enemy Act	May 31, 1938	1255
2077	7902	Establishing the Tamarac Migratory Waterfowl Refuge; Minnesota	May 31, 1938	1255
2078	7903	Transfer of Jurisdiction Over Certain Lands From the Secretary of Agriculture to the Secretary of the Interior; Rhode Island	May 31, 1938	1257
2079	7904	Exemption of Charles H. Hastings From Compulsory Retirement for Age	May 31, 1938	
2080	7905	Authorizing the Appointment of Mrs. Lucile Ensminger to a Classified Position in the Navy Department Without Regard to the Civil Service Rules	May 31, 1938	
2081	7906	Further Modification of Executive Order No. 7709-A of September 16, 1937, Abolishing the National Emergency Council	June 6, 1938	1358
2082	7907	Establishing the Back Bay Migratory Waterfowl Refuge; Virginia	June 6, 1938	1358
2083	7908	Transferring Certain Lands to the Secretary of Agriculture for Use, Administration, and Disposition Under Title III of the Bankhead-Jones Farm Tenant Act	June 9, 1938	1389
2084	7909	Terminating the Powers, Rights, and Duties of the Special Mexican Claims Commission	June 15, 1938	1422
2085	7910	Establishing an Airspace Reservation Over a Portion of the District of Columbia	June 16, 1938	1437
2086	7911	Transferring to the Territory of Hawaii Title to Certain Public Lands	June 16, 1938	1437
2087	7912	Exemption of John H. Thomas From Compulsory Retirement for Age	June 16, 1938	
2088	7913	Authorizing the Extension of Appointments of Certain Employees of the General Accounting Office	June 16, 1938	
2089	7914	Exemption of David A. Brodie From Compulsory Retirement for Age	June 16, 1938	
2090	7915	Amendment of Civil Service Rules	June 24, 1938	1519
2091	7916	Extending the Competitive Classified Civil Service	June 24, 1938	1526
2092	7917	Postponement of Effective Date of Certain Provisions of Executive Order No. 6166 of June 10, 1933	June 25, 1938	
2093	7918	Partial Revocation of Executive Order No. 7181 of September 6, 1935, Excepting From Competitive Civil Service Requirements the Initial Appointments to Certain Positions in the Bureau of Motor Carriers, Interstate Commerce Commission	June 25, 1938	
2094	7919	Appointment of Mrs. Eleanor J. Townsend to a Classified Position Without Regard to Civil Service Rules	June 25, 1938	
2095	7920	Appointment of Mrs. Irene M. Mort to a Classified Position Without Regard to Civil Service Rules	June 29, 1938	
2096	7921	Extending the Existence of the Quetico-Superior Committee, Created by Executive Order No. 6783 of June 30, 1934	June 30, 1938	1625
2097	7922	Directing the Secretary of the Treasury to Assemble Annually a Coast Guard Personnel Board	June 30, 1938	
2098	7923	Establishing Ruby Lake Migratory Waterfowl Refuge; Nevada	July 2, 1938	1639
2099	7924	Revocation of Executive Order No. 6908 of November 21, 1934, Withdrawing Public Lands; Alaska	July 5, 1938	1639
2100	7925	Enlarging the Salt Plains Wildlife Refuge; Oklahoma	July 5, 1938	1639
2101	7926	Establishing Wheeler Migratory Waterfowl Refuge; Alabama	July 7, 1938	1669
2102	7927	Foreign Service Regulations of the United States	July 14, 1938	1749
2103	7928	Designating St. Petersburg, Florida, as a Customs Port of Entry	July 14, 1938	1749
2104	7929	Exemption of Ernest P. Rands From Compulsory Retirement for Age	July 14, 1938	
2105	7930	Exemption of William H. Griffin From Compulsory Retirement for Age	July 14, 1938	
2106	7931	Exemption of Marlon C. Hargrove From Compulsory Retirement for Age	July 14, 1938	
2107	7932	Exemption of Ulysses Shewmaker From Compulsory Retirement for Age	July 14, 1938	
2108	7933	Transferring Funds From the Department of Commerce to the Civil Aeronautics Authority	July 14, 1938	
2109	7933-A	Inspection of Income, Excess-Profits, and Capital Stock Tax Returns by the Special Committee on Un-American Activities, House of Representatives	July 14, 1938	1943
2110	7934	Transferring to the United States Housing Authority Custodial and Maintenance Employees in the Field Service of the Federal Emergency Administration of Public Works Engaged on Federal Housing Projects	July 16, 1938	
2111	7935	Exemption of J. Humbird Smith From Compulsory Retirement for Age	July 16, 1938	
2112	7936	Exemption of Thomas A. Jaggar, Jr., From Compulsory Retirement for Age	July 30, 1938	
2113	7937	Establishing West Sister Island Migratory Bird Refuge; Ohio	August 2, 1938	1943
2114	7938	Correcting Description of Land Reserved by Executive Order No. 3406 of February 13, 1921, for Lighthouse Purposes	August 2, 1938	1944
2115	7939	Partial Revocation of Executive Order No. 5886 of July 12, 1932, Withdrawing Public Lands; Wyoming	August 2, 1938	1944
2116	7940	Transferring Certain Lands Within the Coronado National Forest to the Control and Jurisdiction of the Treasury Department	August 2, 1938	1944
2117	7941	Establishing the Fort Tyler Migratory Bird Refuge; New York	August 2, 1938	1945
2118	7942	Authorizing the Employment of Certain Examiners and Other Experts Paid From Funds Authorized by Public Resolution No. 113, 75th Congress, Without Compliance With the Civil Service Rules	August 2, 1938	1945
2119	7943	Certain Persons Continued in Positions in the National Bituminous Coal Commission Without Regard to Civil Service Rules	August 2, 1938	
2120	7944	Amendment of the Executive Order No. 9 of January 17, 1873, Relating to the Holding of State or Local Offices by Federal Officers and Employees	August 4, 1938	1945
2121	7945	Exemption of Edward M. Weeks From Compulsory Retirement for Age	August 4, 1938	
2122	7946	Limiting the Importation of Red Cedar Shingles From Canada During the Last Six Months of 1938	August 9, 1938	1965
2123	7947	Designating Del Bonita, Montana, as a Customs Port of Entry	August 9, 1938	1965
2124	7948	Exemption of Charles L. Parker From Compulsory Retirement for Age	August 9, 1938	
2125	7949	Exemption of Stephen W. Hamilton From Compulsory Retirement for Age	August 9, 1938	
2126	7950	Exemption of William H. Egberts From Compulsory Retirement for Age	August 9, 1938	
2127	7951	Withdrawal of Public Land for Lookout Station; Arkansas	August 12, 1938	1995
2128	7952	Revocation of Executive Order No. 5341 of May 2, 1930, Withdrawing Public Lands; Arizona	August 12, 1938	1995
2129	7953	Establishing Lake Isom Migratory Waterfowl Refuge; Tennessee	August 12, 1938	1995
2130	7954	Exemption of Frank S. Smith From Compulsory Retirement for Age	August 12, 1938	
2131	7955	Amendment of Executive Order No. 6928 of December 24, 1934	August 13, 1938	2015
2132	7956	Authorizing the Employment Until February 1, 1939, of Personnel With Funds Allotted Under the Public Works Administration Appropriation Act of 1938 Without Compliance With the Requirements of the Civil Service Rules	August 19, 1938	2047
2133	7957	Establishing Cap Meares Migratory Bird Refuge; Oregon	August 19, 1938	2047
2134	7958	Exemption of Samuel J. Gompers From Compulsory Retirement for Age	August 19, 1938	
2135	7959	Transferring Certain Personnel, Property, and Appropriations From the Department of Commerce and the Interstate Commerce Commission to the Civil Aeronautics Authority	August 22, 1938	2071
2136	7960	Reservoir-Site Reserve No. 20; Tongue River, Montana	August 22, 1938	2072
2137	7961	Partial Revocation of Executive Order No. 1919½ of April 21, 1914, as Amended, Withdrawing Public Lands; Alaska	August 22, 1938	2072
2138	7962	Executive Order No. 4601 Amended to Authorize Award of D.F.C. to Lt. Richard L. Burke	August 22, 1938	
2139	7963	Authorizing Initial Appointments to Certain Executive Positions in the Wage and Hour Division in the Department of Labor Without Compliance With the Civil Service Rules	August 29, 1938	2105
2140	7964	Instruction of Citizens of the American Republics at Educational Institutions and Schools Maintained and Administered by the Government of the United States	August 29, 1938	2105
2141	7965	Regulations to Give Effect to Articles I and II of the Convention Providing for the Recovery and Return of Stolen or Embezzled Motor Vehicles, Trailers, Airplanes or Component Parts of Any of Them, Concluded on October 6, 1936, Between the United States of America and the United Mexican States	August 29, 1938	2106
2142	7966	Establishing the Kentucky Woodlands Wildlife Refuge; Kentucky	August 30, 1938	2137
2143	7967	Enlarging the Moosehorn Migratory Bird Refuge; Maine	August 30, 1938	2138
2144	7968	Amending the Foreign Service Regulations of the United States	September 3, 1938	2185
2145	7969	Partial Revocation of Executive Order of February 19, 1920, Creating Power Site Reserve No. 730; Oregon [Power Site Restoration No. 490]	September 10, 1938	2233
2146	7970	Regulations Governing the Grades and Ratings of Enlisted Men of the Regular Army for the Fiscal Year 1939	September 12, 1938	2235
2147	7971	Establishing Montezuma Migratory Bird Refuge; New York	September 12, 1938	2235
2148	7972	Prescribing Regulations Governing Payment of Losses Sustained by Officers, Enlisted Men, and Employees of the United States While in Service in Foreign Countries on Account of Appreciation of Foreign Currencies in Their Relation to the American Dollar	September 15, 1938	2249
2149	7973	Exemption of Alfred R. Wheat From Compulsory Retirement for Age	September 15, 1938	
2150	7974	Exemption of Alfred R. Gould From Compulsory Retirement for Age	September 16, 1938	
2151	7975	Transfer of Jurisdiction Over Certain Lands From the Secretary of Agriculture to the Secretary of the Interior	September 16, 1938	2252
2152	7975-A	Designation of Independent Establishments and Agencies Under Section 6 of Executive Order No. 7916 of June 4, 1938	September 16, 1938	2271
2153	7976	Establishing the Union Slough Migratory Waterfowl Refuge; Iowa	September 19, 1938	2261
2154	7977	Enlarging the St. Marks Migratory Bird Refuge; Florida	September 19, 1938	2262
2155	7978	Exemption of George Middleton From Compulsory Retirement for Age	September 19, 1938	
2156	7979	Cerro Pelado Ammunition Depot Military Reservation; Canal Zone	September 26, 1938	2322
2157	7980	Postponement of Effective Date of Certain Provisions of Executive Order No. 6166 of June 10, 1933	September 29, 1938	2359
2158	7981	Amendment of Subdivision IV, Schedule B, Civil Service Rules	September 29, 1938	2359
2159	7982	Exemption of Herman G.A. Brauer From Compulsory Retirement for Age	September 30, 1938	
2160	7983	Establishing the Breton Bird Refuge; Louisiana	October 4, 1938	2389
2161	7984	Extension of Trust Periods on Indian Lands Expiring During Calendar Year 1939	October 7, 1938	2435
2162	7985	Establishing an Airspace Reservation Over Certain Areas in Maryland	October 8, 1938	2435
2163	7986	Transfers of National-Forest Lands; Idaho	October 8, 1938	2435
2164	7987	Designating Dr. Thomas Parran as Member of Interdepartmental Committee to Coordinate Health and Welfare Activities	October 11, 1938	
2165	7988	Exemption of Miss Ada Tanner From Compulsory Retirement for Age	October 12, 1938	
2166	7989	Exemption of Francis T. Leahy From Compulsory Retirement for Age	October 15, 1938	
2167	7990	Designating Aubrey Williams as Member of Interdepartmental Committee to Coordinate Health and Welfare Activities	October 19, 1938	
2168	7991	Exemption of P. Julian Latham From Compulsory Retirement for Age	October 21, 1938	
2169	7992	Revocation of Executive Order No. 3674 of May 17, 1922, Withdrawing Lands for the Use and Occupancy of the DuBois Rifle Club for Rifle Practice	October 25, 1938	2567
2170	7993	Establishing Great White Heron Refuge; Florida	October 27, 1938	2581
2171	7994	Modification of Okefenokee Wildlife Refuge; Georgia	October 27, 1938	2581
2172	7995	Exemption of William S. Garland From Compulsory Retirement for Age	October 28, 1938	
2173	7996	Exemption of Wallace Streater From Compulsory Retirement for Age	October 28, 1938	
2174	7997	Exemption of Andrew M. Smith From Compulsory Retirement for Age	October 28, 1938	
2175	7998	Establishing the Interdepartmental Committee on Printing and Processing \	October 29, 1938	2603
2176	7999	Transferring to the Secretary of Commerce the Records and Property of the Office of the Administrator of the Census of Partial Employment, Unemployment and Occupations, and Authorizing the Employees of That Office Without Regard to the Competitive Requirements of the Civil Service Rules	October 31, 1938	2603
2177	8000	Correcting and Amending Description of Boundaries of Molokai Lighthouse Reservation; Territory of Hawaii	November 1, 1938	2615
2178	8001	Transferring Certain Lands from the Department of Agriculture to the Department of Commerce and Reserving Them as the Welaka Fish Hatchery; Florida	November 2, 1938	2633
2179	8002	Exemption of Harry Peale From Compulsory Retirement for Age	November 7, 1938	
2180	8003	Partial Revocation of Executive Orders of December 5, 1913, January 13, 1915, and February 23, 1928; Wyoming, Arizona and California [Public Water Restoration No. 81]	November 10, 1938	2679
2181	8004	Withdrawal of Public Lands for Use of the Navy Department for Naval Purposes; California	November 12, 1938	2679
2182	8005	Authorizing the Inspection of Income, Excess-Profits, and Capital Stock Tax Returns, Estate and Gift Tax Returns Filed After June 16, 1933, and Returns Under Title IX of the Social Security Act	November 12, 1938	2679
2183	8006	Inspection of Income and Excess-Profits Tax Returns by the Special Joint Congressional Committee to Make an Investigation of the Tennessee Valley Authority	November 14, 1938	2680
2184	8007	Amendment of Paragraph 6, Subdivision VII, Schedule A, Civil Service Rules	November 15, 1938	2733
2185	8008	Changing the Name of the Big Lake Reservation to Big Lake Migratory Bird Refuge, and Adding Certain Lands Thereto; Arkansas	November 17, 1938	2747
2186	8009	Withdrawal of Public Lands; California, Idaho, Oregon, and Wyoming [Public Water Reserve No. 160]	November 18, 1938	2755
2187	8010	Withdrawal of Public Lands, Reservoir-Site Reserve No. 21; Cache Creek, California	November 18, 1938	2756
2188	8011	Exemption of Arthur H. Chase From Compulsory Retirement for Age	November 19, 1938	
2189	8012	Appointment of Miss Sarah Wilson Reed to a Classified Position in the Navy Department	November 25, 1938	
2190	8013	Enlarging the Waubay Migratory Waterfowl Refuge; South Dakota	November 25, 1938	2783
2191	8014	Placing Certain Land Under the Control of the Secretary of the Interior; Alaska	November 26, 1938	2800
2192	8015	Correcting the Description of Lands Reserved as Union Slough Migratory Waterfowl Refuge, Iowa	November 30, 1938	2821
2193	8016	Amending the Foreign Service Regulations of the United States	December 1, 1938	2847
2194	8017	Revocation of Executive Order No. 6672 of April 7, 1934, Withdrawing Public Lands; Wyoming	December 2, 1938	2861
2195	8018	Amendment of Executive Order No. 7972 of September 15, 1938	December 2, 1938	2861
2196	8019	Exemption of George M. Lewis From Compulsory Retirement for Age	December 2, 1938	
2197	8020	Withdrawal of Public Land in Aid of Flood Control	December 2, 1938	2861
2198	8021	Withdrawal of Public Land for Forest Lookout Station; Wyoming	December 5, 1938	2883
2199	8022	Excusing Federal Employees From Duty on December 24 and 31, 1938	December 6, 1938	2883
2200	8023	Modification of Executive Order No. 4683 of July 4, 1927, Withdrawing Public Lands for Town-Site Purposes; Alaska	December 6, 1938	2883
2201	8024	Exemption of Percy A. Baker From Compulsory Retirement for Age	December 9, 1938	
2202	8025	Exemption of Cloyd A. McIlvaine From Compulsory Retirement for Age	December 17, 1938	
2203	8026	Postponement of Effective Date of Certain Provisions of Executive Order No. 6166 of June 10, 1933	December 23, 1938	
2204	8027	Authorizing Initial Appointments to Certain Executive and Policy Forming Positions in the Wage and Hour Division in the Department of Labor Without Compliance With the Civil Service Rules	December 23, 1938	
2205	8028	Changing the Title of Executive Director of the National Youth Administration to Administrator of the National Youth Administration	December 24, 1938	3161
2206	8029	Documents Required of Aliens Entering the United States	December 27, 1938	3177
2207	8030	Transfer of Lands From the Cochetopa National Forest to the Rio Grande National Forest; Colorado	December 29, 1938	3187

=== 1939 ===
Relative No.	Absolute No.	Title / Description	Date signed	FR Citation
2208	8031	Revocation of Executive Order No. 4130 of January 22, 1925, Withdrawing Public Land for Fish Hatchery; Oregon	January 9, 1939	193
2209	8032	Exemption of Mrs. Cora M. Armstrong from Compulsory Retirement for Age	January 10, 1939	
2210	8033	Designating the Director of Planning of the National Capital Park and Planning Commission as a Member of the Alley Dwelling Authority	January 11, 1939	223
2211	8034	Establishing the Federal Real Estate Board	January 14, 1939	249
2212	8035	Amendment of Paragraph 5, Subdivision IV, Schedule B, Civil Service Rules	January 16, 1939	271
2213	8036	Amending the Foreign Service Regulations of the United States	January 18, 1939	377
2214	8037	Establishing the Piedmont Wildlife Refuge; Georgia	January 18, 1939	391
2215	8038	Establishing the Cabeza Prieta Game Range; Arizona	January 25, 1939	437
2216	8039	Establishing the Kofa Game Range; Arizona	January 25, 1939	438
2217	8040	Regulations Governing the Payment of Additional Compensation to Enlisted Men of the Navy Specially Qualified in the Use of Arms	January 25, 1939	438
2218	8041	Exemption of Henry Clarke Hill from Compulsory Retirement for Age	January 25, 1939	
2219	8042	Authorizing Initial Appointments to Certain Positions in the Air Safety Board, Civil Aeronautics Authority, Without Compliance With the Civil Service Rules	January 30, 1939	481
2220	8043	Amending Schedules A and B of the Civil Service Rules	January 31, 1939	493
2221	8044	Postponing the Effective Date of Executive Order No. 7916 of June 24, 1938, With Respect to Certain Positions and Providing for a Committee to Investigate and Report Methods for Selecting and Promoting Certain Personnel in Civil Service	January 31, 1939	497
2222	8045	Authorizing the Appointment of Frederick Morgan Davenport to a Classified Position in the Civil Service Commission and Designating Him as a Member and Chairman of the Council of Personnel Administration	February 8, 1939	695
2223	8046	Exemption of Louis A. Simon from Compulsory Retirement for Age	February 11, 1939	
2224	8047	Exemption of Edward B. Russ from Compulsory Retirement for Age	February 11, 1939	
2225	8048	Exemption of John G. Crane from Compulsory Retirement for Age	February 14, 1939	
2226	8049	Exemption of George W. Patterson from Compulsory Retirement for Age	February 15, 1939	
2227	8050	Exemption of Robert F. Whitehead from Compulsory Retirement for Age	February 15, 1939	
2228	8051	Limiting the Importation of Red Cedar Shingles from Canada During the First Six Months of 1939	February 15, 1939	959
2229	8052	Designating the Honorable Angel R. de Jesus as Acting Judge of the District Court of the United States for Puerto Rico	February 23, 1939	1023
2230	8053	Partial Revocation of Executive Orders of January 24, 1914; California and Oregon	February 23, 1939	1023
2231	8054	Placing Certain Land Under the Control and Jurisdiction of the Secretary of the Treasury; Alaska	February 23, 1939	1023
2232	8055	Transfer of Jurisdiction Over Certain Lands from the Secretary of Agriculture to the Secretary of the Interior	February 23, 1939	1024
2233	8056	Amendment of Paragraph 4, Subdivision IV, Schedule B, Civil Service Rules	February 23, 1939	1025
2234	8057	Transfer of Certain Lands from the Secretary of Agriculture to the Secretary of the Interior; Virginia	February 23, 1939	1025
2235	8058	Exemption of Alex Hrdlicka from Compulsory Retirement for Age	February 23, 1939	
2236	8059	Transferring the Use, Possession, and Control of Certain Lands to the Tennessee Valley Authority; Alabama	March 3, 1939	1119
2237	8060	Exemption of Fred C. Bailey from Compulsory Retirement for Age	March 7, 1939	
2238	8061	Transferring Certain Land to the Control and Jurisdiction of the Treasury Department; Virgin Islands	March 7, 1939	1181
2239	8062	Tariff of Fees of Officers of United States Court for China	March 7, 1939	1181
2240	8063	Authorizing Initial Appointments to Certain Executive Positions in the Railroad Retirement Board Without Compliance With the Civil Service Rules	March 7, 1939	1183
2241	8064	Designating Fairbanks, Alaska, as a Customs Port of Entry, and Discontinuing Seward, Alaska, as a Customs Port of Entry	March 9, 1939	1191
2242	8065	Establishing the Necedah Migratory Waterfowl Refuge; Wisconsin	March 14, 1939	1241
2243	8066	Ratification of Appointments of Walter Kearney and Stanley D. Zaveckas to State Department	March 17, 1939	
2244	8067	Establishing the Carolina Sandhills Wildlife Refuge; South Carolina	March 17, 1939	1257
2245	8068	Amendment of Rules 17 and 18 of Executive Order No. 4314 of September 25, 1925, Establishing Rules Governing Navigation of the Panama Canal and Adjacent Waters	March 20, 1939	1258
2246	8069	Revoking the Designation of Gateway, Montana, as a Customs Port of Entry	March 20, 1939	1259
2247	8070	Exemption of Sims Ely from Compulsory Retirement for Age	March 21, 1939	
2248	8071	Establishing the Federal Interdepartmental Safety Council	March 21, 1939	1291
2249	8072	Withdrawal of Public Land for Use of the Navy Department for Naval Aviation Purposes; Washington	March 21, 1939	1291
2250	8073	Exemption of Newton C. Lammond from Compulsory Retirement for Age	March 23, 1939	
2251	8074	Exemption of George K. Larrison from Compulsory Retirement for Age	March 25, 1939	
2252	8075	Exemption of Glenn S. Smith from Compulsory Retirement for Age	April 4, 1939	
2253	8076	Amending the Foreign Service Regulations of the United States	April 4, 1939	1473
2254	8077	Amending the Foreign Service Regulations of the United States	April 4, 1939	1474
2255	8078	Amending the Foreign Service Regulations of the United States	April 4, 1939	1475
2256	8079	Changing the Name of the Customs Port of Entry of Mars Hill, Maine, to Bridgewater, Maine	April 4, 1939	1475
2257	8080	Revoking the Designation of Fair Haven, New York, as a Customs Port of Entry	April 4, 1939	1475
2258	8081	Establishing the Anclote Migratory Bird Refuge; Florida	April 5, 1939	1475
2259	8082	Appointment of Mrs. Esther H. Soter to a Classified Position in Federal Trade Commission	April 8, 1939	
2260	8083	Extending the Provisions of the Civil Service Retirement Act to Certain Federal Employees, and Amending Civil Service Rule II	April 10, 1939	1577
2261	8084	Amending the Foreign Service Regulations of the United States	April 11, 1939	1595
2262	8085	Withdrawal of Public Land for Forest Ranger Station; Colorado	April 11, 1939	1597
2263	8086	Establishing the Morgan Farm Wildlife Refuge; Vermont	April 11, 1939	1611
2264	8087	Excluding Certain Tracts of Land from the Chugach and Tongass National Forests and Restoring Them to Entry; Alaska	April 12, 1939	1612
2265	8088	Revocation of Executive Order No. 5789 of February 2, 1932, and Partial Revocation of Executive Order No. 5792 of February 2, 1932, Withdrawing Public Lands; California and Nevada	April 12, 1939	1612
2266	8089	Withdrawal of Public Lands for Use of the War Department for Flood Control Purposes; Oklahoma	April 13, 1939	1619
2267	8090	Restoring to the Commonwealth of the Philippines a Part of the Military Reservation of Nozaleda	April 15, 1939	1641
2268	8091	Modifying Executive Order No. 2224 of July 19, 1915, and Reserving Certain Lands for Use of the Department of Agriculture; Alaska	April 15, 1939	1641
2269	8092	Amendment of Schedule B of the Civil Service Rules	April 17, 1939	1642
2270	8093	Revocation of Executive Order No. 6119 of May 2, 1933, Withdrawing Public Lands; California	April 17, 1939	1649
2271	8094	Exemption of Zeke Johnson from Compulsory Retirement for Age	April 19, 1939	
2272	8095	Transfer of Jurisdiction Over Certain Lands from the Secretary of Agriculture to the Secretary of the Interior, and Withdrawal of Lands from the Public Domain for the Use of the Department of Agriculture; New Mexico	April 19, 1939	1662
2273	8096	Exemption of William C. Shambaugh from Compulsory Retirement for Age	April 21, 1939	
2274	8097	Exemption of Charles J. Carlton from Compulsory Retirement for Age	April 24, 1939	
2275	8098	Revocation of Executive Order No. 5538 of January 23, 1931, Withdrawing Public Lands; Colorado	April 24, 1939	1697
2276	8099	Administration of Benefits Provided by Act of Congress Approved April 3, 1939	April 24, 1939	1725
2277	8100	Enlarging the Homochitto National Forest; Mississippi	April 28, 1939	1725
2278	8101	Withdrawal of Public Land for Use of the War Department as a Target Range for the Wyoming National Guard; Wyoming	April 28, 1939	1725
2279	8102	Withdrawal of Public Lands for Use as a Military Reservation; Alaska	April 29, 1939	1726
2280	8103	Amendment of Executive Order No. 7302 of February 21, 1936, Transferring Certain Lands to the Control and Jurisdiction of the Secretary of the Navy	May 2, 1939	1771
2281	8104	Establishing the Little Pend Oreille Wildlife Refuge; Washington	May 2, 1939	1771
2282	8105	Exemption of Herbert E. Lucas from Compulsory Retirement for Age	May 3, 1939	
2283	8106	Exemption of Frank B. Bourn from Compulsory Retirement for Age	May 3, 1939	
2284	8107	Amendment of Executive Order No. 7293 of February 14, 1936, as Amended by Executive Order No. 7831 of March 7, 1938, Prescribing Regulations Governing the Granting of Allowances for Quarters and Subsistence to Enlisted Men	May 3, 1939	1903
2285	8108	Revocation of Executive Order No. 6644 of March 14, 1934, Withdrawing Public Lands; Colorado	May 3, 1939	1903
2286	8109	Connecting the Description of the Walanae-Kai Military Reservation and Restoring a Part Thereof to the Territory of Hawaii	May 3, 1939	1903
2287	8110	Establishing the Appert Lake Migratory Waterfowl Refuge; North Dakota	May 10, 1939	1993
2288	8111	Establishing Billings Lake Migratory Waterfowl Refuge; North Dakota	May 10, 1939	1993
2289	8112	Establishing Bone Hill Creek Migratory Waterfowl Refuge; North Dakota	May 10, 1939	1993
2290	8113	Establishing Buffalo Lake Migratory Waterfowl Refuge; North Dakota	May 10, 1939	1994
2291	8114	Establishing the Camp Lake Migratory Waterfowl Refuge	May 10, 1939	1994
2292	8115	Establishing Canfield Lake Migratory Waterfowl Refuge; North Dakota	May 10, 1939	1995
2293	8116	Establishing Charles Lake Migratory Waterfowl Refuge; North Dakota	May 10, 1939	1955
2294	8117	Establishing Dakota Lake Migratory Waterfowl Refuge; North Dakota	May 10, 1939	1955
2295	8118	Establishing the Flickertail Migratory Waterfowl Refuge; North Dakota	May 10, 1939	1955
2296	8119	Establishing Florence Lake Migratory Waterfowl Refuge; North Dakota	May 10, 1939	1995
2297	8120	Establishing the Half-Way Migratory Waterfowl Refuge; North Dakota	May 10, 1939	1996
2298	8121	Establishing the Hutchinson Lake Migratory Waterfowl Refuge; North Dakota	May 10, 1939	1996
2299	8122	Establishing the Johnson Lake Migratory Waterfowl Refuge; North Dakota	May 10, 1939	1996
2300	8123	Establishing the Lake Moraine Migratory Waterfowl Refuge; North Dakota	May 10, 1939	1996
2301	8124	Establishing the Lake Oliver Migratory Waterfowl Refuge; North Dakota	May 10, 1939	1996
2302	8125	Establishing the Little Goose Migratory Waterfowl Refuge; North Dakota	May 10, 1939	1997
2303	8126	Establishing the Little Lake Migratory Waterfowl Refuge; North Dakota	May 10, 1939	1997
2304	8127	Establishing Lords Lake Migratory Waterfowl Refuge; North Dakota	May 10, 1939	1997
2305	8128	Establishing Lost Lake Migratory Waterfowl Refuge; North Dakota	May 10, 1939	1997
2306	8129	Establishing Minnewastena Migratory Waterfowl Refuge; North Dakota	May 10, 1939	1997
2307	8130	Transfer of Lands from the Cache National Forest to the Caribou National Forest; Idaho	May 11, 1939	2017
2308	8131	Inspection of Income, Excess-Profits, and Capital Stock Tax Returns by the Special Committee on Un-American Activities, House of Representatives	May 11, 1939	2025
2309	8132	Exemption of Lilian M. Lamb from Compulsory Retirement for Age	May 12, 1939	
2310	8133	Further Amending Executive Order No. 7677-A of July 26, 1937, as Amended, Entitled "Civilian Conservation Corps"	May 15, 1939	2043
2311	8134	Modification of Executive Order No. 6746 of June 21, 1934, as Modified, Prescribing Rates of Compensation of Government Employees in Emergency Agencies, Etc.	May 15, 1939	2043
2312	8135	Appeals from Decisions of the Auditor General of the Philippines to the President of the United States	May 15, 1939	2043
2313	8136	Delegating Certain Powers to the Attorney General and Directing the Secretary of the Treasury to Sell Certain Securities	May 15, 1939	2044
2314	8137	Authorizing the Extension of Appointments of Certain Employees of the General Accounting Office	May 17, 1939	
2315	8138	Partial Revocation of Executive Order of July 9, 1910, Creating Coal Land Withdrawal, Montana No. 1	May 17, 1939	2067
2316	8139	Exemption of James E. Harper from Compulsory Retirement for Age	May 19, 1939	
2317	8140	Restoring Lands to Territory of Hawaii for Road Purposes and Reserving Lands for Military Purposes, Punchbowl Hill Military Reservation	May 22, 1939	2099
2318	8141	Transferring the Use, Possession, and Control of Certain Lands to the Tennessee Valley Authority; Alabama	May 23, 1939	2127
2319	8142	Exemption of Thomas A. Jaggar, Jr., from Compulsory Retirement for Age	May 25, 1939	
2320	8143	Establishing a Defensive Sea Area in and About Pearl Harbor; Hawaii	May 26, 1939	2179
2321	8144	Partial Revocation of Executive Order of July 2, 1910, Creating Petroleum Reserve No. 7, Utah No. 1. Petroleum Restoration No. 61; Utah	May 26, 1939	2179
2322	8145	Changing the Name of the Nine-Pipe Reservation to Nine-Pipe Migratory Waterfowl Refuge and Adding Certain Lands Thereto	May 31, 1939	2201
2323	8146	Reinstatement of Former Foreign Service Officer Paul H. Alling	June 12, 1939	
2324	8147	Establishing the Ardoch Lake Migratory Waterfowl Refuge; North Dakota	June 12, 1939	2405
2325	8148	Establishing the Brumba Migratory Waterfowl Refuge; North Dakota	June 12, 1939	2405
2326	8149	Establishing the Cottonwood Lake Migratory Waterfowl Refuge; North Dakota	June 12, 1939	2405
2327	8150	Establishing the Hiddenwood Lake Migratory Waterfowl Refuge; North Dakota	June 12, 1939	2406
2328	8151	Establishing the Hobart Lake Migratory Waterfowl Refuge; North Dakota	June 12, 1939	2406
2329	8152	Establishing Lake Elsie Migratory Waterfowl Refuge; North Dakota	June 12, 1939	2406
2330	8153	Establishing Lake George Migratory Waterfowl Refuge	June 12, 1939	2407
2331	8154	Establishing Lake Ilo Migratory Waterfowl Refuge; North Dakota	June 12, 1939	2407
2332	8155	Establishing the Lake Nettie Migratory Waterfowl Refuge; North Dakota	June 12, 1939	2407
2333	8156	Establishing Lake Patricia Migratory Waterfowl Refuge; North Dakota	June 12, 1939	2407
2334	8157	Establishing the Lake Susie Migratory Waterfowl Refuge; North Dakota	June 12, 1939	2408
2335	8158	Establishing the Lake Zahl Migratory Waterfowl Refuge; North Dakota	June 12, 1939	2408
2336	8159	Establishing the Lambs Lake Migratory Waterfowl Refuge; North Dakota	June 12, 1939	2408
2337	8160	Establishing Legion Lake Migratory Waterfowl Refuge; North Dakota	June 12, 1939	2408
2338	8161	Enlarging the Long Lake Migratory Bird Refuge; North Dakota	June 12, 1939	2408
2339	8162	Establishing the Maple River Migratory Waterfowl Refuge; North Dakota	June 12, 1939	2409
2340	8163	Establishing Pioneer Lake Migratory Waterfowl Refuge; North Dakota	June 12, 1939	2409
2341	8164	Establishing the Pleasant Lake Migratory Waterfowl Refuge; North Dakota	June 12, 1939	2409
2342	8165	Establishing Rock Lake Migratory Waterfowl Refuge; North Dakota	June 12, 1939	2409
2343	8166	Establishing Shell Lake Migratory Waterfowl Refuge; North Dakota	June 12, 1939	2410
2344	8167	Establishing the Sibley Lake Migratory Waterfowl Refuge; North Dakota	June 12, 1939	2410
2345	8168	Transferring from the Department of Agriculture to the Department of Commerce Certain Lands at Sitka, Alaska, for Use as a Magnetic and Seismological Observatory Site by the Bureau of Coast and Geodetic Survey	June 14, 1939	2415
2346	8169	Partial Revocation of Executive Order No. 6153 of June 3, 1933, Withdrawing Public Lands; Colorado	June 14, 1939	2415
2347	8170	Appointment of A. Sidney Johnson to a Classified Position in the Treasury Department	June 15, 1939	
2348	8171	Transfer of Jurisdiction Over Certain Lands from the Secretary of Agriculture to the Secretary of War	June 15, 1939	2443
2349	8172	Excluding Certain Tracts of Land from the Chugach and Tongass National Forests and Restoring Them to Entry	June 15, 1939	2443
2350	8173	Establishing the Talcot Lake Migratory Waterfowl Refuge; Minnesota	June 15, 1939	2454
2351	8174	Amending Executive Order No. 6901 of November 13, 1934 Withdrawing Public Land as a Wildlife Administrative Site; Alaska	June 15, 1939	2455
2352	8175	Partial Revocation of Executive Order of March 21, 1914; Wyoming	June 21, 1939	2467
2353	8176	Regulations Governing the Grades and Ratings of Enlisted Men of the Regular Army for the Fiscal Year 1940	June 21, 1939	2467
2354	8177	Amending the Foreign Service Regulations of the United States	June 21, 1939	2467
2355	8178	Partial Revocation of Executive Order of August 2, 1875, Withdrawing Public Land; Florida	June 21, 1939	2468
2356	8179	Amending Certain Provisions of the Civil Service Rules	June 21, 1939	2468
2357	8180	Effective Date of Election by Retired Foreign Service Officers to Receive Reduced Annuities	June 21, 1939	2475
2358	8181	Amending the Foreign Service Regulations of the United States	June 22, 1939	2491
2359	8182	Postponement of Effective Date of Certain Provisions of Executive Order No. 6166 of June 10, 1933	June 28, 1939	
2360	8183	Excusing Federal Employees from Duty on July 3, 1939	June 28, 1939	2699
2361	8184	Amending Executive Order No. 7532 of January 8, 1937, Establishing the Shinnecock Migratory Bird Refuge	June 28, 1939	2699
2362	8185	Administration of the Foreign Service Under Reorganization Plan No. II	June 29, 1939	2749
2363	8186	Transferring to the Federal Works Administrator the Functions Transferred to the Secretary of the Treasury by Executive Order No. 7641 of June 22, 1937	June 29, 1939	2749
2364	8187	Amendment of Subdivision VI, Schedule A. of the Civil Service Rules	June 29, 1939	2749
2365	8188	Revocation of Executive Order No. 4539 of November 6, 1926, Withdrawing Public Lands; Utah	June 29, 1939	2749
2366	8189	Amending the Foreign Service Regulations of the United States	July 5, 1939	2783
2367	8190	Placing the Committee for Reciprocity Information Under the Jurisdiction and Control of the Department of State	July 5, 1939	2785
2368	8191	Placing the Goethals Memorial Commission Under the Jurisdiction and Control of the War Department	July 5, 1939	2785
2369	8192	Partial Revocation of Executive Order No. 2608 of May 4, 1917, and Rewithdrawal for Use by the Forest as an Addition to an Existing Administrative Site; Alaska	July 5, 1939	2785
2370	8193	Partial Revocation of Executive Order No. 5894 of July 26, 1932, Withdrawing Public Land; Colorado	July 5, 1939	2786
2371	8193-A	Assignment of Frequencies to Government Radio Stations	July 5, 1939	2897
2372	8194	Placing the Federal Fire Council Under the Federal Works Agency	July 6, 1939	2786
2373	8195	Exemption of Frederick S. Jackson from Compulsory Retirement for Age \	July 7, 1939	
2374	8196	Amending the Foreign Service Regulations of the United States	July 8, 1939	2911
2375	8197	Regulations Pertaining to the Administration of the Act of May 3, 1939, Public No. 63, 76th Congress, 1st Session	July 11, 1939	2953
2376	8198	Suspension of Eight-Hour Law as to Construction of Certain Emergency Air Bases	July 11, 1939	2954
2377	8199	Partial Revocation of Executive Orders of July 9, 1910, May 18, 1911, August 25, 1915, and May 22, 1917, Creating, Respectively, Coal Land Withdrawals Nos. 1, 6, 8, and 10	July 11, 1939	2954
2378	8200	Partial Revocation of Executive Order No. 5886 of July 12, 1932, Withdrawing Public Lands; Wyoming	July 11, 1939	2955
2379	8201	Amendment of Executive Order No. 7302 of February 21, 1936, Transferring Certain Lands to the Control and Jurisdiction of the Secretary of the Navy; Virgin Islands	July 11, 1939	2955
2380	8282	Authorizing and Requesting the Federal Power Commission to Perform Certain Functions Relating to the Transmission of Electric Energy Between the United States and Foreign Countries and to the Exportation and Importation of Natural Gas from and Into the United States	July 13, 1939	3243
2381	8203	Transfer of Jurisdiction Over Certain Lands from the Secretary of Agriculture to the Secretary of War	July 13, 1939	3243
2382	8204	Exemption of Michael E. Gorman from Compulsory Retirement for Age	July 14, 1939	
2383	8205	Authorizing the Initial Appointment of the Assistant Administrator of the Federal Security Agency and One Private Secretary to the Assistant Administrator Without Compliance With the Civil Service Rules, and Amending Schedule A of the Civil Service Rules	July 14, 1939	3313
2384	8206	Revocation of Executive Order No. 6432 of November 16, 1933, Withdrawing Public Lands; Wyoming	July 14, 1939	3313
2385	8207	Exemption of Dr. George F. Bowerman from Compulsory Retirement for Age	July 17, 1939	
2386	8208	Exemption of Mrs. Frances S. Nichols from Compulsory Retirement for Age	July 17, 1939	
2387	8209	Exemption of William M. Smith from Compulsory Retirement for Age	July 17, 1939	
2388	8210	Amending the Foreign Service Regulations of the United States	July 17, 1939	3367
2389	8211	Revocation of Executive Order No. 5633 of May 28, 1931, Withdrawing Public Lands	July 19, 1939	3395
2390	8212	Reinstatement of Former Foreign Service Officer James J. Murphy, Jr.	July 25, 1939	
2391	8213	Exemption of Erastus S. Hawkins from Compulsory Retirement for Age	July 25, 1939	
2392	8214	Providing Additional Time-Eligibility for Reinstatement Under Civil Service Rules of Certain Former Federal Employees	July 25, 1939	3429
2393	8215	Amendment of Section 15 of Executive Order No. 1888 of February 2, 1914, Prescribing General Conditions of Employment for Employees of the Panama Canal and the Panama Railroad Company on the Isthmus of Panama	July 25, 1939	3430
2394	8216	Withdrawing Public Land and Water for Naval Purposes; Alaska	July 25, 1939	3430
2395	8217	Exemption of George Middleton from Compulsory Retirement for Age	August 7, 1939	
2396	8218	Exemption of Herbert Vansant from Compulsory Retirement for Age	August 7, 1939	
2397	8219	Designating the Secretary of Agriculture as the Officer to Exercise the Rights of the United States Arising Out of the Ownership of the Capital Stock of the Commodity Credit Corporation	August 7, 1939	3565
2398	8220	Partial Revocation of Certain Executive Orders Creating Temporary Power-Site Withdrawals and Power-Site Reserves; Oregon	August 7, 1939	3565
2399	8221	Further Amending Executive Order No. 7677-A, of July 26, 1937, as Amended, Entitled "Civilian Conservation Corps"	August 21, 1939	3715
2400	8222	Exempting Certain Positions from Salary Classification	August 21, 1939	3715
2401	8223	Modifying Executive Order No. 1919½ of April 21, 1914, and Reserving Certain Lands for Use of the Alaska Road Commission for Aviation Field Purposes; Alaska	August 21, 1939	3716
2402	8224	Exemption of John P. Dunlop from Compulsory Retirement for Age	August 24, 1939	
2403	8225	Abolishing Customs Collection District Number 44 (Iowa); Extending Limits of Customs Collection District Number 39 (Chicago) to Include the State of Iowa; and Revoking the Designations of Des Moines, Iowa, Oklahoma City, Oklahoma, and Tulsa, Oklahoma, as Customs Ports of Entry	August 24, 1939	3721
2404	8226	Amending Section 15 of Executive Order No. 7845 of March 21, 1938, Prescribing Regulations Relating to Annual Leave of Government Employees	August 24, 1939	3722
2405	8227	Amending Section 18 of Executive Order No. 7846 of March 21, 1938, Prescribing Regulations Relating to Sick Leave of Government Employees	August 24, 1939	3722
2406	8228	Exemption of William T. Andrews from Compulsory Retirement for Age	August 24, 1939	
2407	8229	Promotion of Lieutenant Harry R. Lohman, District of Columbia Police Force, Without Regard to Civil Service Rules	August 26, 1939	
2408	8230	Authorizing the Inspection of Certain Returns Made Under the Internal Revenue Code	August 28, 1939	3777
2409	8231	Exemption of Edward M. Weeks from Compulsory Retirement for Age	August 31, 1939	
2410	8232	Control of the Panama Canal and the Canal Zone	September 5, 1939	3812
2411	8233	Prescribing Regulations Governing the Enforcement of the Neutrality of the United States	September 5, 1939	3822
2412	8234	Prescribing Regulations Governing the Passage and Control of Vessels Through the Panama Canal in Any War in Which the United States is Neutral	September 5, 1939	3823
2413	8235	Appointment of Mrs. Coey Custer Jones to Public Health Service Without Regard to Civil Service Rules	September 6, 1939	
2414	8236	Authorizing the Inspection of Certain Income Tax Withholding Returns by the Department of National Revenue, Ottawa, Canada	September 6, 1939	3835
2415	8237	Amending Subdivision XVI of Schedule A of the Civil Service Rules	September 6, 1939	3835
2416	8238	Extending the Limits of the Customs Port of Entry of Baltimore, Maryland, in Customs Collection District Number 13 (Maryland), to Include Sparrows Point, Maryland	September 6, 1939	3835
2417	8239	Power Site Restoration No. 492, Partial Revocation of Executive Orders of December 19, 1910, Creating Power Site Reserve No. 165 and of January 23, 1912, Creating Power Site Reserve No. 241	September 6, 1939	3836
2418	8240	Construction of Executive Order of September 16, 1889, Enlarging Fort Meade Wood and Timber Military Reservation; South Dakota	September 6, 1939	3836
2419	8241	Revocation of Executive Order No. 6774 of June 30, 1934, Withdrawing Public Lands; Washington	September 6, 1939	3837
2420	8242	Transfer of Miss Charlotta Gallap to Federal Communications Commission Without Regard to Civil Service Rules	September 7, 1939	
2421	8243	Prescribing Regulations Governing the Enforcement of the Neutrality of the United States	September 8, 1939	3863
2422	8244	Authorizing an Increase in the Strength of the Army	September 8, 1939	3863
2423	8245	Authorizing Increases in the Enlisted Strengths of the Navy and the Marine Corps	September 8, 1939	3863
2424	8246	Making Funds Available for the Protection of American Citizens in Foreign Countries During the Existing Emergency	September 8, 1939	3863
2425	8247	Authorizing Increases in the Personnel of the Federal Bureau of Investigation, Department of Justice	September 8, 1939	3864
2426	8248	Establishing the Divisions of the Executive Office of the President and Defining Their Functions and Duties	September 8, 1939	3864
2427	8249	Prescribing Regulations Governing the Enforcement of the Neutrality of the United States	September 10, 1939	3889
2428	8250	Revocation of Executive Order No. 2006 of July 30, 1914, Placing Certain Land Under the Jurisdiction of the Secretary of the Navy for Use as a Naval Radio Station	September 11, 1939	3890
2429	8251	Regulations Governing the Entrance of Foreign and Domestic Aircraft Into the Canal Zone, and Navigation Therein	September 12, 1939	3899
2430	8252	Exemption of Samuel J. Gompers from Compulsory Retirement for Age	September 14, 1939	
2431	8253	Exemption of Walter I. Swanton from Compulsory Retirement for Age	September 18, 1939	
2432	8254	Authorizing Increases in the Personnel and Facilities of the United States Coast Guard, Treasury Department	September 18, 1939	3983
2433	8255	Transfer of Control and Jurisdiction Over Certain Lands from the Secretary of Agriculture to the Secretary of the Interior	September 18, 1939	3983
2434	8256	Exemption of Maurice C. Latta from Compulsory Retirement for Age	September 20, 1939	
2435	8257	Authorizing Excepted Appointments to Meet Public Exigency	September 21, 1939	4023
2436	8258	Amending Paragraph 7, Subdivision I, Schedule A of the Civil Service Rules	September 21, 1939	4023
2437	8259	Exemption of Harry T. Edwards from Compulsory Retirement for Age	September 21, 1939	
2438	8260	Exemption of James L. Hughes from Compulsory Retirement for Age	September 21, 1939	
2439	8261	Amendment of Executive Order No. 7972 of September 15, 1938	September 21, 1939	4043
2440	8262	Exemption of Samuel A. Cottrell from Compulsory Retirement for Age	September 26, 1939	
2441	8263	Exemption of William F. Mackenzie from Compulsory Retirement for Age	September 26, 1939	
2442	8264	Appointment of Master Sergeant Morris Swett, United States Army Retired, as Librarian Without Compliance With Civil Service Rules	September 30, 1939	
2443	8265	Designation of the Director of the Bureau of Mines to Act as Secretary of the Interior, or as Under Secretary, First Assistant Secretary, or Assistant Secretary of the Interior	September 30, 1939	4108
2444	8266	Exempting Certain Positions from Salary Classification	October 4, 1939	4167
2445	8267	Amendment of Executive Order No. 7242 of December 6, 1935, Prescribing Regulations Governing Highways, Vehicles, and Vehicular Traffic in the Canal Zone	October 5, 1939	4183
2446	8268	Exemption of George W. Stone from Compulsory Retirement for Age	October 9, 1939	
2447	8269	Amendment of Basic Exchange Rates Prescribed by Section 4 of Executive Order No. 7972 of September 15, 1938	October 11, 1939	4241
2448	8270	Exemption of Edward M. Neville from Compulsory Retirement for Age	October 16, 1939	
2449	8271	Amendment of Section 6 of Executive Order No. 8251 of September 12, 1939, Prescribing Regulations Governing the Entrance of Foreign and Domestic Aircraft Into the Canal Zone, and Navigation Therein	October 16, 1939	4277
2450	8272	Amendment of Subdivision VII, Schedule A, Civil Service Rules	October 16, 1939	4277
2451	8273	Excepting Appointments in the United States Coronado Exposition Commission from the Requirements of the Civil Service Act and Rules	October 21, 1939	4321
2452	8274	Exemption of Edward A. Neill from Compulsory Retirement for Age	October 26, 1939	
2453	8275	Exemption of Harvey J. Zimmerman from Compulsory Retirement for Age	October 26, 1939	
2454	8276	Extension of Trust Periods on Indian Lands Expiring During Calendar Year 1940	October 28, 1939	4444
2455	8277	Transfer of Jurisdiction Over Certain Lands from the Secretary of Agriculture to the Secretary of War; Oklahoma	October 28, 1939	4444
2456	8278	Withdrawing Public Land and Water for Naval Purposes; Alaska	October 28, 1939	4444
2457	8279	Designation of the Director of the Bureau of Mines to Act as Secretary of the Interior, or as Under Secretary, First Assistant Secretary, or Assistant Secretary of the Interior	October 28, 1939	4445
2458	8280	Amendment of Paragraph 4, Subdivision IV, Schedule B of the Civil Service Rules	October 31, 1939	4453
2459	8281	Amendment of Executive Order No. 8176 of June 21, 1939, Prescribing Regulations Governing the Grades and Ratings of Enlisted Men of the Regular Army for the Fiscal Year 1940	November 1, 1939	4453
2460	8282	Exemption of John S. Biggs from Compulsory Retirement for Age	November 9, 1939	
2461	8283	Amendment of Section 6 of Civil Service Rule II	November 9, 1939	4565
2462	8284	Prescribing the Duties of the Librarian Emeritus of the Library of Congress	November 13, 1939	4603
2463	8285	Appointment of George K. Briggs Without Regard to Civil Service Rules	November 16, 1939	
2464	8286	Exemption of Hugh J. Murray from Compulsory Retirement for Age	November 16, 1939	
2465	8287	Exemption of Arthur H. Chase from Compulsory Retirement for Age	November 18, 1939	
2466	8288	Making Certain Changes in the Field Organization of the Customs Service in the State of Texas	November 22, 1939	4691
2467	8289	Establishing the Bosque del Apache National Wildlife Refuge	November 22, 1939	4691
2468	8290	Retirement of Foreign Service Officer Franklin B. Atwood	November 30, 1939	
2469	8291	Excusing Federal Employees from Duty on December 23 and 30, 1939	November 30, 1939	4761
2470	8292	Amending the Foreign Service Regulations of the United States	November 30, 1939	4761
2471	8293	Suspension of Eight-Hour Law as to Persons Employed by the Government in the Construction of Certain Emergency Air Bases	November 30, 1939	4762
2472	8294	Appointment of Admiral William D. Leahy, Governor of the Territory of Puerto Rico, as Administrator of the Puerto Rico Reconstruction Administration	November 30, 1939	4763
2473	8295	Partial Revocation of Executive Order of January 3, 1917, and June 16, 1925	November 30, 1939	4763
2474	8296	Changing the Name of the Pathfinder Wildlife Refuge and Adding Certain Lands Thereto	November 30, 1939	4763
2475	8297	Amending the Foreign Service Regulations of the United States	December 4, 1939	4779
2476	8298	Regulations Governing the Manner of Executing and Returning Commissions by Officers of the Foreign Service in Criminal Cases, and Schedule of Fees and Compensation in Such Cases	December 4, 1939	4781
2477	8299	Withdrawal of Public Lands; Colorado	December 4, 1939	4782
2478	8300	Amendment of Section 2 (b) of Civil Service Rule VII	December 12, 1939	4847
2479	8301	Authorizing and Directing Carroll L. Wilson, Special Assistant to the Secretary of Commerce, to Act as Director of the Bureau of Foreign and Domestic Commerce During the Sickness or Absence of the Director	December 12, 1939	4847
2480	8302	Exemption of Frank Burke from Compulsory Retirement for Age	December 12, 1939	
2481	8303	Waiver of E.O. of Jan. 17, 1873, to Permit Huntington Cairns to Hold State Office	December 13, 1939	
2482	8304	Revocation of Executive Order No. 2552 of March 21, 1917, Withdrawing Public Lands for Lighthouse Purposes; Alaska	December 19, 1939	4909
2483	8305	Reserving Certain Public Lands for the Use of the War Department for Military Purposes; Alaska	December 19, 1939	4909
2484	8306	Taxes and Licenses in the Canal Zone	December 19, 1939	4909
2485	8307	Amending the Foreign Service Regulations of the United States	December 19, 1939	4910
2486	8308	Exemption of Gerrit S. Miller, Jr., from Compulsory Retirement for Age	December 19, 1939	
2487	8309	Exemption of Harry J. Morrison from Compulsory Retirement for Age	December 19, 1939	
2488	8310	Exemption of Louis C. Vogt from Compulsory Retirement for Age	December 19, 1939	
2489	8311	Exemption of Alexander McKeon from Compulsory Retirement for Age	December 19, 1939	
2490	8312	Exemption of David D. Caldwell from Compulsory Retirement for Age	December 21, 1939	
2491	8313	Appointment of Henry Schneider to Treasury Department Without Regard to Civil Service Rules	December 22, 1939	
2492	8314	Exemption of John Kieley from Compulsory Retirement for Age	December 22, 1939	
2493	8315	Making Certain Changes in Customs Collection District No. 38; Michigan	December 22, 1939	4941
2494	8316	Authorizing the Initial Appointment to a Certain Position in the Wage and Hour Division, Department of Labor, Without Compliance With the Civil Service Rules, and Revoking in Part Executive Order No. 8027 of December 23, 1938	December 27, 1939	4979

=== 1940 ===
Relative No.	Absolute No.	Title / Description	Date signed	FR Citation
2495	8317	Amendment of Schedule B of the Civil Service Rules	January 10, 1940	165
2496	8318	Authorization of Committee on Education and Labor, United States Senate, to Inspect Income, Profits, and Capital Stock Tax Returns and Returns of Employment Tax on Employers	January 10, 1940	194
2497	8319	Changing the Name of the Necedah Migratory Waterfowl Refuge and Adding Certain Lands Thereto; Wisconsin	January 15, 1940	207
2498	8320	Amending the Description of the Aiea Military Reservation; Territory of Hawaii	January 15, 1940	207
2499	8321	Establishing the Battery Cove Military Reservation; Virginia	January 15, 1940	208
2500	8322	Exemption of John M. Terwilliger from Compulsory Retirement for Age	January 15, 1940	
2501	8323	Abolishing Customs Collection District No. 43 (Tennessee), Revoking the Designations of Memphis, Chattanooga, and Nashville, Tennessee, as Customs Ports of Entry, and Extending the Limits of Customs Collection District No. 42 (Kentucky) and Customs Collection District No. 45 (Saint Louis)	January 22, 1940	271
2502	8324	Abolishing Customs Collection District No. 48 (Utah and Nevada), Revoking the Designation of Salt Lake City, Utah, as a Customs Port of Entry, and Extending the Limits of Customs Collection District No. 28 (San Francisco) to Include the States of Utah and Nevada	January 22, 1940	271
2503	8325	Withdrawal of Public Land for Use of the War Department; Alaska	January 22, 1940	271
2504	8326	Exemption of William S. Garland from Compulsory Retirement for Age	January 22, 1940	
2505	8327	Exemption of Dr. Mary B. Harris from Compulsory Retirement for Age	January 22, 1940	
2506	8328	Exemption of Henry Clarke Hill from Compulsory Retirement for Age	January 22, 1940	
2507	8329	Waiver of Time Limitation to Permit Reinstatement of Rural Carrier Van C. Brodrick	January 22, 1940	
2508	8330	Withdrawal of Public Land in Aid of Flood Control; Alaska	January 24, 1940	314
2509	8331	Enlarging the Upper Mississippi River Wildlife and Fish Refuge; Minnesota and Wisconsin	January 24, 1940	314
2510	8332	Withdrawal of Public Land for the Improvement of the Flood Channel of the Big Black River; Mississippi	January 25, 1940	315
2511	8333	Amending Executive Order No. 5952 of November 23, 1932, Prescribing the Army Ration	January 25, 1940	315
2512	8334	Authorizing the Archivist of the United States to Effect Initial Appointments to Certain Positions in the Franklin D. Roosevelt Library Without Regard to the Requirements of the Civil Service Act and Rules	January 25, 1940	
2513	8335	Extending the Limits of the Customs Port of Entry of Charleston, South Carolina, in Customs Collection District Number 16; South Carolina	January 31, 1940	429
2514	8336	Revocation of Executive Order No. 3355 of November 19, 1920, Withdrawing Land for Use as an Administrative Site; Alaska	February 3, 1940	594
2515	8337	Placing Certain Lands Under the Control and Jurisdiction of the Navy Department, the War Department, and the United States Public Health Service; Puerto Rico	February 3, 1940	594
2516	8338	Partial Revocation of Executive Order No. 6795 of July 26, 1934, Withdrawing Public Lands	February 6, 1940	625
2517	8339	Authorizing the Civil Service Commission to Confer a Competitive Classified Civil-Service Status Upon Certain Employees Assigned to the Wage and Hour Division of the Department of Labor	February 6, 1940	625
2518	8340	Exemption of Frank E. Gass from Compulsory Retirement for Age	February 8, 1940	
2519	8341	Revocation of Executive Order No. 8323 of January 22, 1940, Abolishing Customs Collection District No. 43 (Tennessee), Revoking the Designations of Memphis, Chattanooga, and Nashville, Tennessee, as Customs Ports of Entry, and Extending the Limits of Customs Collection District No. 42 (Kentucky) and Customs Collection District No. 45 (St. Louis)	February 8, 1940	643
2520	8342	Withdrawal of Public Land in Aid of Flood Control; Oklahoma	February 9, 1940	653
2521	8343	Withdrawal of Public Lands for Military Purposes; Alaska	February 10, 1940	654
2522	8344	Withdrawal of Public Land for Classification; Alaska	February 10, 1940	654
2523	8345	Exemption of Fred C. Bailey from Compulsory Retirement for Age	February 12, 1940	
2524	8346	Amending the Foreign Service Regulations of the United States	February 12, 1940	671
2525	8347	Transferring the Use, Possession, and Control of Certain Lands to the Tennessee Valley Authority; Alabama	February 12, 1940	672
2526	8348	Exemption of John E. White from Compulsory Retirement for Age	February 12, 1940	
2527	8349	Exemption of Thomas E. McElree from Compulsory Retirement for Age	February 14, 1940	
2528	8350	Exemption of Alexander E. Twomey from Compulsory Retirement for Age	February 14, 1940	
2529	8351	Exemption of Sims Ely from Compulsory Retirement for Age	February 25, 1940	
2530	8352	Amending Chapter IX of the Foreign Service Regulations of the United States	February 25, 1940	819
2531	8353	Restoring the Possession, Use, and Control of Certain Land to the Territory of Hawaii	February 25, 1940	819
2532	8354	Fort Kobbe Military Reservation; Canal Zone	February 25, 1940	820
2533	8355	Transfer of Lands from the Idaho National Forest to the Salmon National Forest; Idaho	February 25, 1940	827
2534	8356	Rules of Precedence Relating to Foreign Service Officers and Other Officers of the United States Government	March 2, 1940	949
2535	8357	Administration of the Foreign Service Under Reorganization Plan No. II	March 2, 1940	949
2536	8358	Revocation of Executive Order No. 4308 of September 23, 1925, Withdrawing Public Lands for Classification; Arizona	March 2, 1940	950
2537	8359	Partial Revocation of Executive Order No. 3406 of February 13, 1921, Withdrawing Lands for Lighthouse Purposes; Alaska	March 2, 1940	951
2538	8360	Amendment of Paragraph 1, Subdivision VI, Schedule B of the Civil Service Rules	March 2, 1940	951
2539	8361	Amendment of Executive Order No. 6909 of November 21, 1934, Withdrawing Public Lands for Use in Connection With a Grazing Project; South Dakota	March 2, 1940	951
2540	8362	Appointment of Archie L. Hardy to Social Security Board Without Compliance With Civil Service Rules	March 2, 1940	
2541	8363	Amendment of Executive Order No. 8283 of November 9, 1939, Amending Section 6 of Civil Service Rule II	March 4, 1940	952
2542	8364	Revocation of Executive Order No. 5346 of May 9, 1930, Withdrawing Public Lands; Minnesota	March 4, 1940	952
2543	8365	Appointment of Mrs. Rose S. Rutledge to a Clerical Position in Agriculture Department	March 4, 1940	
2544	8366	Designating the Chairman of the Board of Governors of the Federal Reserve System	March 5, 1940	985
2545	8367	Extending the Limits of the Customs Port of Entry of Savannah, Georgia, in Customs Collection District Number 17 (Georgia)	March 5, 1940	985
2546	8368	Exemption of Ales Hrdlicka from Compulsory Retirement for Age	March 7, 1940	
2547	8369	Exemption of Louis A. Simon from Compulsory Retirement for Age	March 7, 1940	
2548	8370	Appointment of Edith M. Watkins to Department of Justice Without Regard to Civil Service Rules	March 8, 1940	
2549	8371	Amending Section 3 of Executive Order No. 8044 of January 31, 1939, and Appointing Attorney General Robert H. Jackson a Member of the Committee to Investigate and Report Methods for Selecting and Promoting Certain Personnel in Civil Service	March 9, 1940	1029
2550	8372	Modification of Executive Order No. 6957 of February 4, 1935, Withdrawing Public Lands; Alaska	March 9, 1940	1029
2551	8373	Designating the Honorable Angel R. de Jesus as Acting Judge of the District Court of the United States for Puerto Rico	March 9, 1940	1029
2552	8374	Exemption of Charles F. Markey from Compulsory Retirement for Age	March 13, 1940	
2553	8375	Exemption of James F. Rogers from Compulsory Retirement for Age	March 13, 1940	
2554	8376	Placing Certain Lands Under the Control of the Secretary of the Interior; New Mexico	March 13, 1940	1077
2555	8377	Amending Executive Order No. 8356 Entitled "Rules of Precedence Relating to Foreign Service Officers and their Officers of the United States Government"	March 18, 1940	1113
2556	8378	Establishing an Airspace Reservation Over a Portion of the District of Columbia	March 18, 1940	1114
2557	8379	Amending the Foreign Service Regulations	March 19, 1940	1114
2558	8380	Changing the Name of the Cold Springs Reservation to Cold Springs National Wildlife Refuge and Adding Certain Lands Thereto; Oregon	March 19, 1940	1115
2559	8381	Defining Certain Vital Military and Naval Installations and Equipment	March 22, 1940	1147
2560	8382	Amendment of Executive Order No. 8234 of September 5, 1939, Prescribing Regulations Governing the Passage and Control of Vessels Through the Panama Canal in Any War in Which the United States is Neutral	March 25, 1940	1185
2561	8383	Authorizing the Civil Service Commission to Confer a Classified Civil Service Status Upon Certain Employees of the Office of Indian Affairs In Accordance With Section 3 of Executive Order No. 7916 of June 24, 1938	March 28, 1940	1233
2562	8384	Prescribing Regulations Relating to Annual Leave of Government Employees	March 29, 1940	1253
2563	8385	Prescribing Regulations Relating to Sick Leave of Government Employees	March 29, 1940	1256
2564	8386	Exemption of John W. Kindle from Compulsory Retirement for Age	April 4, 1940	
2565	8387	Partial Revocation of Executive Order of December 5, 1913	April 4, 1940	1353
2566	8388	Restoring Certain Land to the Use of the Territory of Hawaii and Setting Aside Certain Land in Lieu Thereof for Military Purposes of the United States	April 5, 1940	1361
2567	8389	Amendment of Executive Order No. 6560, Dated January 15, 1934, Regulating Transactions in Foreign Exchange, Transfers of Credit, and the Export of Coin and Currency	April 10, 1940	1400
2568	8390	Amending the Executive Order No. 9 of January 17, 1873, to Permit Employees of the Federal Government to Hold Certain Positions in the Schools and Universities of Any State, Territory, or Municipality	April 11, 1940	1411
2569	8391	Exemption of Clifton E. Johnson from Compulsory Retirement for Age	April 12, 1940	
2570	8392	Exemption of Zeke Johnson from Compulsory Retirement for Age	April 12, 1940	
2571	8393	Restoring Certain Lands Comprising Part of the Makua Military Reservation to the Use of the Territory of Hawaii	April 12, 1940	1432
2572	8394	Partial Revocation of Executive Order of June 8, 1866, Withdrawing Public Land; Oregon	April 13, 1940	1443
2573	8395	Authorizing appointment of Floyd E. Julian as a Rural Letter Carrier Without Regard to Civil Service Rules	April 17, 1940	
2574	8396	Amending the Foreign Service Regulations of the United States	April 18, 1940	1461
2575	8397	Withdrawal of Public Lands in Aid of Legislation; Idaho	April 23, 1940	1557
2576	8398	Prescribing Regulations Governing the Enforcement of the Neutrality of the United States	April 25, 1940	1570
2577	8399	Amending the Executive Order No. 9 of January 17, 1873, to Permit Officers and Employees of the Social Security Board, Federal Security Agency, to Hold State, Territorial and Municipal Offices, Etc.	April 29, 1940	1607
2578	8400	Amending the Foreign Service Regulations of the United States	April 29, 1940	1627
2579	8401	Exemption of Percy Nicholls from Compulsory Retirement for Age	May 7, 1940	
2580	8402	Exemption of Nelson S. Thompson from Compulsory Retirement for Age	May 7, 1940	
2581	8403	Establishing Los Angeles-Long Beach Harbor Naval Defensive Sea Area; California	May 7, 1940	1661
2582	8404	Authorizing the Civil Service Commission to Reopen Under Certain Conditions Examinations from Which Appointments May Be Made to Positions in the Social Security Board	May 7, 1940	1661
2583	8405	Amendment of Executive Order No. 8389 of April 10, 1940, Amending Executive Order No. 6560, Dated January 15, 1934	May 10, 1940	1677
2584	8406	Prescribing Regulations Governing the Enforcement of the Neutrality of the United States	May 11, 1940	1691
2585	8407	Withdrawal of Public Land in Aid of Flood Control; Louisiana	May 10, 1940	1691
2586	8408	Exemption of Huntt P. Larcombe from Compulsory Retirement for Age	May 15, 1940	
2587	8409	Exemption of Jacob C. Lesher from Compulsory Retirement for Age	May 15, 1940	
2588	8410	Exemption of Harry C. Oberholser from Compulsory Retirement for Age	May 15, 1940	
2589	8411	Withdrawal of Public Land for the Use of the Alaska Road Commission; Alaska	May 16, 1940	1811
2590	8412	Exemption of Charles M. Eichelberger from Compulsory Retirement for Age	May 17, 1940	
2591	8413	Exemption of Hurbert K. Bishop from Compulsory Retirement for Age	May 18, 1940	
2592	8414	Exemption of William C. Shambaugh from Compulsory Retirement for Age	May 18, 1940	
2593	8415	Appointment of Lyman A. Fillmen to a Classified Position in the Smithsonian Institution Without Regard to Civil Service Rules	May 20, 1940	
2594	8416	Authorizing Appointment of William T. Geurts as Senior Mediator, Maritime Labor Board Without Regard to Civil Service Rules	May 22, 1940	
2595	8417	Amendment of Rule 120 of Executive Order No. 4314 of September 25, 1925, Establishing Rules Governing Navigation of the Panama Canal and Adjacent Waters and the Exclusion of Persons from the Canal Zone, as Amended by Executive Order No. 5065 of February 28, 1929	May 22, 1940	1943
2596	8418	Appointment of Mrs. Jeanette M. Priester as Record Clerk at Navy Yard Without Regard to Civil Service Rules	May 24, 1940	
2597	8419	Partial Revocation of Executive Order of July 7, 1910, Creating Coal Land Withdrawal, Utah No. 1	May 27, 1940	2093
2598	8420	Exemption of James E. Harper from Compulsory Retirement for Age	May 28, 1940	
2599	8421	Exemption of Joseph E. Reardon from Compulsory Retirement for Age	May 28, 1940	
2600	8422	Exemption of James E. Harper from Compulsory Retirement for Age	May 28, 1940	
2601	8423	Amendment of Section 2(b) of Civil Service Rule VII	May 28, 1940	2099
2602	8424	Amending Paragraph 7, Subdivision I, Schedule A of the Civil Service Rules	May 28, 1940	2099
2603	8425	Amendment of Section 1(a) of Civil Service Rule IX	May 29, 1940	2099
2604	8426	Waiver of Age Limit for Florence S. Ellenberger to Compete in Civil Service Examination as Postmaster	June 1, 1940	
2605	8427	Prescribing Rules and Regulations for the Administration of the Interbuilding Mail and Messenger Service	June 3, 1940	2131
2606	8428	Revoking Executive Order No. 6228 of July 28, 1933, as to Custer Battlefield National Cemetery	June 3, 1940	2131
2607	8429	Documents Required of Bona Fide Alien Seamen Entering the United States	June 5, 1940	2145
2608	8430	Documents Required of Aliens Entering the United States	June 5, 1940	2146
2609	8431	Revocation of Executive Order No. 6845 of September 11, 1934, Withdrawing Public Lands; Colorado	June 8, 1940	2193
2610	8432	Revocation of Executive Order No. 5208 of October 12, 1929, Withdrawing Public Lands; Nevada	June 8, 1940	2193
2611	8433	Prescribing Regulations Governing the Enforcement of the Neutrality of the United States	June 10, 1940	2193
2612	8434	Transferring the Control and Jurisdiction Over a Certain Tract of Land to the Federal Works Agency for Use of the Bureau of Customs, Treasury Department; Texas	June 10, 1940	2210
2613	8435	Modifying Executive Order of November 21, 1916, Creating Power Site Reserve No. 565	June 10, 1940	2211
2614	8436	Appointment of Baird Snyder III to position of Deputy Administrator, Wage and Hour Division, Department of Labor	June 11, 1940	2211
2615	8437	Power Site Restoration No. 493. Partial Revocation of Executive Order of November 22, 1924, Creating Power Site Reserve No. 759	June 11, 1940	2221
2616	8438	Extending the Provisions of the Civil Service Retirement Act to Employees of the Office of Legal Adviser, Department of State	June 11, 1940	
2617	8439	Amending the Foreign Service Regulations of the United States	June 12, 1940	2221
2618	8440	Amendment of Executive Order No. 7293 of February 14, 1936, as Amended, Prescribing Regulations Governing the Granting of Allowances for Quarters and Subsistence to Enlisted Men	June 12, 1940	2221
2619	8441	Amendment of Paragraph 6, Subdivision VI, Schedule A of the Civil Service Rules	June 12, 1940	2222
2620	8442	Revoking in Part Executive Order No. 6039 of February 20, 1933, and Reserving Certain Lands for Town Site Purposes; Alaska	June 12, 1940	2222
2621	8443	Directing the Secretary of the Treasury to Assemble Annually a Coast Guard Personnel Board	June 14, 1940	
2622	8444	Establishing the Noxubee National Wildlife Refuge; Mississippi	June 14, 1940	2251
2623	8445	Amending Executive Order No. 8135 of May 15, 1939, Relating to Appeals from Decisions of the Auditor General of the Philippines to the President of the United States	June 15, 1940	2279
2624	8446	Amendment of Executive Order No. 8389 of April 10, 1940, as Amended	June 17, 1940	2279
2625	8447	Authorizing the Civil Service Commission to Confer a Competitive Classified Civil-Service Status Upon Certain Employees of the Department of Labor	June 17, 1940	2301
2626	8448	Exemption of Maitland S. Wright from Compulsory Retirement for Age	June 18, 1940	
2627	8449	Amendment of Subdivision VIII, Schedule A of the Civil Service Rules	June 19, 1940	2315
2628	8450	Withdrawal of Public Lands for Use of the War Department as a Bombing and Gunnery Range; California	June 20, 1940	2329
2629	8451	Appointment of Russell Sturgis to a Position in the Wage and Hour Division, Department of Labor	June 20, 1940	2329
2630	8452	Exemption of Albert Clyde-Burton from Compulsory Retirement for Age	June 20, 1940	
2631	8453	Exemption of Burnett Booker from Compulsory Retirement for Age	June 21, 1940	
2632	8454	Regulations Governing the Allowance of Travel Expenses of Claimants and Beneficiaries of the Veterans' Administration, and Their Attendants	June 26, 1940	2397
2633	8455	Designating Additional Construction Agencies and Providing for the Planning and Programming of Construction Undertaken or Aided by the Federal Government	June 26, 1940	2420
2634	8456	Authorizing the Extension of Appointments of Certain Employees of the General Accounting Office	June 27, 1940	
2635	8457	Authorizing Certain Employees of the General Accounting Office to Acquire a Classified Civil-Service Status	June 27, 1940	
2636	8458	Directing the Civil Service Commission to Establish a Replacement List of Non-Civil Service Employees for Use for Temporary Appointments to National Defense Positions	June 27, 1940	2435
2637	8459	Withdrawal of Public Lands for the Use of the Department of Agriculture; New Mexico	June 27, 1940	2435
2638	8460	Modifying Executive Order of February 7, 1913, Creating Power Site Reserve No. 339	June 27, 1940	2436
2639	8461	Amendment of Executive Order No. 8099 of April 28, 1939, Relating to Administration of Benefits Provided by Act of Congress Approved April 3, 1939	June 28, 1940	2436
2640	8461-A	Authorizing the Archivist of the United States to Make Certain Appointments to the Franklin D. Roosevelt Library without Regard to the Provisions of Civil-Service Law	June 28, 1940	
2641	8462	Appointment of Wilford S. Alexander as District Supervisor, Alcohol Tax Unit, Bureau of Internal Revenue	June 29, 1940	
2642	8463	Appointment of Charles Leo Milroy and James E. Spratt to Classified Positions Federal Works Agency Without Regard to Civil Service Rules	June 29, 1940	
2643	8464	Appointment of Mrs. Gertrude S. Cooper as Superintendent of Vanderbilt Mansion, National Park Service, Without Regard to Civil Service Rules	June 29, 1940	
2644	8465	Regulations Governing Certifications of the Secretary of War and the Secretary of the Navy With Respect to Special Additional Equipment and Facilities Required to Facilitate Construction of Naval Vessels and Army and Navy Aircraft	June 29, 1940	2453
2645	8466	Appointment of Leland L. Tolman and H. Fred Martin, Jr., to Legal Positions in Administrative Office, U.S. Courts, Without Regard to Civil Service Rules	July 1, 1940	
2646	8467	Amending Section 7 of Executive Order No. 7916 of June 24, 1938, Extending the Competitive Classified Civil Service	July 1, 1940	2468
2647	8468	Withdrawal of Public Lands for Classification and in Aid of Legislation; Louisiana	July 1, 1940	2468
2648	8469	Appointment of John F. Harry as Regional Director, Social Security Board, Without Regard to Civil Service Rules	July 3, 1940	
2649	8470	Accepting a Conveyance of Certain Lands on Government Island from the City of Alameda, California, and Placing Such Lands Under the Jurisdiction and Control of the Federal Works Agency	July 8, 1940	2519
2650	8471	Transfer of Jurisdiction Over Certain Lands from the Secretary of Agriculture to the Secretary of the Interior	July 8, 1940	2519
2651	8472	Amendment of Executive Order No. 7975 of September 16, 1938, Transferring Jurisdiction Over Certain Lands from the Secretary of Agriculture to the Secretary of the Interior	July 8, 1940	2520
2652	8473	Transfer of Jurisdiction Over Certain Lands from the Secretary of Agriculture to the Secretary of the Interior	July 8, 1940	2520
2653	8474	Appointment of Newton B. Drury as Director of National Park Service Without Regard to Civil Service Rules	July 9, 1940	
2654	8475	Partial Revocation of Executive Order No. 924 of August 8, 1908, Establishing the Klamath Lake Reservation; Oregon	July 10, 1940	2541
2655	8476	Waiver of Time Limitations in Civil Service Rule IX to Permit Reinstatement of Mrs. Martha Overstreet as Clerk in Post Office	July 10, 1940	
2656	8477	Exemption of Samuel Cohn from Compulsory Retirement for Age	July 10, 1940	
2657	8478	Authorizing Certain Appointments to Positions in the Welfare Unit, Public Buildings Administration, Without Regard to Civil Service Rules	July 10, 1940	
2658	8479	Transferring Certain Lands from the Secretary of Agriculture to the Secretary of the Interior and Reserving Them as a Part of the Necedah National Wildlife Refuge	July 11, 1940	2557
2659	8480	Excluding Certain Land from the Chugach National Forest and Reserving it for Townsite Purposes; Alaska	July 12, 1940	2558
2660	8481	Exemption of Ernest G. Dodge from Compulsory Retirement for Age	July 12, 1940	
2661	8482	Appointment of Norman H. Stevens As a Rural Letter Carrier Without Regard to Civil Service Rules	July 13, 1940	
2662	8483	Exemption of Louis Loebl from Compulsory Retirement for Age	July 16, 1940	
2663	8484	Amendment of Executive Order No. 8389 of April 10, 1940, as Amended	July 15, 1940	2586
2664	8485	Appointment of Peres D. Ziegler as a Rural Letter Carrier Without Regard to Civil Service Rules	July 16, 1940	
2665	8486	Modification of Executive Order No. 7515 of December 16, 1936, Withdrawing Public Land for Use of the War Department; Arizona	July 16, 1940	2607
2666	8487	Designating the Vice Chairman of the Board of Governors of the Federal Reserve System	July 18, 1940	2629
2667	8488	Appointment of Walter Kuhn as Guard in Public Buildings Administration Without Regard to Civil Service Rules	July 18, 1940	
2668	8489	Exemption of William M. Smith from Compulsory Retirement for Age	July 18, 1940	
2669	8490	Authorizing the Inspection by Certain Officials of the District of Columbia, Alaska, Hawaii, the Philippine Islands, and Puerto Rico of Certain Returns Made Under the Internal Revenue Code and of Income, Excess-Profits, and Capital Stock Tax Returns Filed Under the Revenue Act of 1938 or Prior Revenue Acts, Estate and Gift Tax Returns Filed After June 16, 1933, and Returns Under Title IX of the Social Security Act	July 20, 1940	2645
2670	8491	Exemption of William F. Yates from Compulsory Retirement for Age	July 23, 1940	
2671	8492	Withdrawal of Public Land for Fire Lookout Station; California	July 23, 1940	2667
2672	8493	Amendment of Executive Order No. 8389 of April 10, 1940, as Amended	July 25, 1940	2668
2673	8494	Authorizing the Civil Service Commission to Confer a Competitive Classified Civil Service Status on Five Employees in the Disbursing Office of the Division of Disbursement of the Treasury at Honolulu, Territory of Hawaii	July 25, 1940	2681
2674	8495	Designation of Agencies for the Purpose of Carrying Out the Provisions of Section 40 of the Emergency Relief Appropriation Act, Fiscal Year 1941	July 26, 1940	2682
2675	8496	Modifying Executive Order of March 28, 1924, Creating Reservoir Site Reserve No. 16	July 26, 1940	2682
2676	8497	Exemption of Maurice C. Latta from Compulsory Retirement for Age	July 26, 1940	
2677	8498	Transferring to the Control and Jurisdiction of the Treasury Department the Remaining Part of the Site of the Naval Reservation on Ediz Hook, Port Angeles, Washington	July 27, 1940	2699
2678	8499	Modifying Executive Order of September 5, 1914, Creating Power Site Reserve No. 454	July 30, 1940	2713
2679	8500	Modifying Executive Order of December 12, 1917, Creating Power Site Reserve No. 661	July 30, 1940	2713
2680	8501	Transferring the Fort Howard Military Reservation, Maryland, to the Control and Jurisdiction of the Veterans Administration	August 2, 1940	2753
2681	8502	Regulations Governing the Grades and Ratings of Enlisted Men of the Regular Army for the Fiscal Year 1941	August 3, 1940	2767
2682	8503	Exemption of Zebedee La Pelle from Compulsory Retirement for Age	August 3, 1940	
2683	8504	Exemption of James E. Amos from Compulsory Retirement for Age	August 7, 1940	
2684	8505	Excluding Certain Land from the Chugach National Forest and Withdrawing the Unreserved Portion for Townsite Purposes; Alaska	August 7, 1940	2806
2685	8506	Excluding Certain Tracts of Land from the Chugach and Tongass National Forests and Restoring Them to Entry; Alaska	August 8, 1940	2817
2686	8507	Withdrawal of Public Lands for the War Department; California	August 8, 1940	2817, 3652
2687	8508	Withdrawal of Public Land for the War Department; Florida	August 8, 1940	2818
2688	8509	Establishing the Missouri Wildlife Management Area; Missouri	August 8, 1940	2818
2689	8510	Establishing the Carolina Sandhills Wildlife Management Area; South Carolina	August 8, 1940	2819
2690	8511	Transferring Jurisdiction and Control Over Certain Land on the Island of St. Croix, Virgin Islands, from the Department of the Interior to the War Department	August 9, 1940	2819
2691	8512	Regulations Pertaining to Budgetary Administration and Financial Reporting	August 13, 1940	2850
2692	8513	Authorizing Appointments of Neal Smith, William T. Bie, Charles L. Milroy, William S. De Groff, and Cornelius Lynch to Positions in the Public Buildings Administration	August 12, 1940	
2693	8514	Authorizing the Civil Service Commission to Permit Transfers During Probation to Appropriate Positions Directly Concerned With the National Defense Program	August 13, 1940	2857
2694	8515	Setting Aside an Area Within the Canal Zone to Preserve and Conserve Its Natural Features for Scientific Observation and Investigation	August 13, 1940	2857
2695	8516	Suspending and Making Inoperative the Executive Order No. 9 of January 17, 1873, as Amended, Insofar as the United States Civil Service Commission Shall, by Regulation, Authorize Appointments to Positions Directly Concerned with National Defense	August 15, 1940	2881
2696	8517	Changing the Name of the Delta Migratory Waterfowl Refuge to Delta National Wildlife Refuge and Adding Certain Lands; Louisiana	August 16, 1940	2882
2697	8518	Modification of Executive Order No. 2123 of January 20, 1915, Reserving Certain Public Land as a Native Bird Refuge; Washington	August 16, 1940	2882
2698	8519	Certain Townsite Lots for the Use of the Forest Service; Wyoming	August 16, 1940	2882
2699	8520	Exemption of George F. McDade from Compulsory Retirement for Age	August 20, 1940	
2700	8521	Partial Revocation of Executive Order No. 4203 of April 14, 1925; California	August 20, 1940	2955
2701	8522	Authorizing Appointment of Anna F. Smith to a Custodial Position in the Post Office Without Regard to Civil Service Rules	August 22, 1940	
2702	8523	Regulations Governing the Payment of Additional Compensation to Enlisted Men of the Coast Guard Specially Qualified in the Use of Arms	August 22, 1940	3173
2703	8524	Exemption of J. Brent Clarke from Compulsory Retirement for Age	August 26, 1940	
2704	8525	Exemption of Harry T. Edwards from Compulsory Retirement for Age	August 26, 1940	
2705	8526	Coordinating the Electrical Facilities of Grand Coulee Dam Project and Bonneville Project	August 26, 1940	3390
2706	8527	Transferring from the War Department to the Treasury Department Certain Land Comprising a Part of Sand Island Military Reservation, Territory of Hawaii	August 27, 1940	3403
2707	8528	Extending the Limits of the Customs Port of Entry of Kansas City, Missouri, in Customs Collection District Number 45 (St. Louis)	August 27, 1940	3403
2708	8529	Revocation of Executive Order No. 4901 of June 4, 1928, Withdrawing Public Land for Classification and in Aid of Legislation; New Mexico	August 27, 1940	3403
2709	8530	Ordering Certain Units and Members of the National Guard of the United States Into the Active Military Service of the United States	August 31, 1940	3501
2710	8531	Amending Executive Order No. 7908 of June 9, 1938, Transferring Certain Lands to the Secretary of Agriculture for Use, Administration, and Disposition Under Title III of the Bankhead-Jones Farm Tenant Act	August 31, 1940	3539
2711	8532	Amending Paragraph 1 of Executive Order No. 8458 of June 27, 1940, Directing the Civil Service Commission to Establish a Replacement List of Non-Civil Service Employees for Use for Temporary Appointments to National-Defense Positions	September 4, 1940	3589
2712	8533	Designating the Secretary of the Treasury to Act in Respect of Any Bonds, Notes, or Other Securities Acquired on Behalf of the United States Under the Provisions of the Transportation Act, 1920, as Amended	September 6, 1940	3601
2713	8534	Amending Schedules A and B of the Civil Service Rules	September 6, 1940	3601
2714	8535	Amending the Foreign Service Regulations of the United States	September 6, 1940	3606
2715	8536	Establishing San Clemente Island Naval Defensive Sea Area; California	September 6, 1940	3606
2716	8537	Appointment of Certain Experts to Antitrust Division, Justice Department, Without Regard to Civil Service Rules	September 11, 1940	
2717	8538	Exemption of Z. Lewis Dalby from Compulsory Retirement for Age	September 12, 1940	
2718	8539	Exemption of Herbert A. Howell from Compulsory Retirement for Age	September 14, 1940	
2719	8540	Revoking in Part Executive Order No. 8344 of February 10, 1940, and Reserving Public Land for Use as an Air Navigation Site; Alaska	September 14, 1940	3700
2720	8541	Designation of the Assistant Secretary of Commerce and the Solicitor of Commerce to Act as Secretary of Commerce	September 17, 1940	3745
2721	8542	Appointment of Harold Ambrose to a Classified Position in the Post Office Department Without Regard to Civil Service Rules	September 18, 1940	
2722	8543	Exemption of Samuel J. Gompers from Compulsory Retirement for Age	September 18, 1940	
2723	8544	Transfer of Lands from the Lolo National Forest to the Helena National Forest; Montana	September 19, 1940	3761
2724	8545	Selective Service Regulations	September 23, 1940	3779
2725	8546	Creating the Defense Communications Board and Defining Its Functions and Duties	September 24, 1940	3817, 3827
2726	8547	Amending the Foreign Service Regulations of the United States	September 24, 1940	3818
2727	8548	Establishing the North Carolina Wildlife Management Area; North Carolina	September 24, 1940	3819
2728	8549	Designating the Secretary of the Treasury to Accept on Behalf of the United States a Certain Tract of Land Authorized to be Conveyed to the United States by the Legislature of Puerto Rico	September 24, 1940	3820
2729	8550	Modification of Executive Order No. 3271 of May 11, 1920, Withdrawing Public Lands; Utah	September 24, 1940	3820
2730	8551	Ordering Certain Units and Members of the National Guard of the United States Into the Active Military Service of the United States	September 25, 1940	3820
2731	8552	Exemption of George W. Stose from Compulsory Retirement for Age	September 25, 1940	
2732	8553	Designating Lieutenant Colonel Lewis B. Hershey to Perform Certain Duties Under the Selective Training and Service Act of 1940	September 28, 1940	3887
2733	8554	Exemption of William T. Andrews from Compulsory Retirement for Age	September 28, 1940	
2734	8555	Exemption of Samuel A. Cottrell from Compulsory Retirement for Age	September 28, 1940	
2735	8556	Transferring the Use, Possession, and Control of Certain Lands to the Tennessee Valley Authority; Alabama	September 28, 1940	3869
2736	8557	Prescribing Regulations Governing the Payment of Expenses Incurred in Connection With the Death of Certain Civilian Officers and Employees of the United States	September 30, 1940	3888
2737	8558	Transferring Certain Lands to the Secretary of Agriculture for Use, Administration, and Disposition Under Title III of the Bankhead-Jones Farm Tenant Act	October 1, 1940	3898
2738	8559	Designating Colonel Lewis B. Hershey to Perform Certain Duties Under the Selective Training and Service Act of 1940	October 4, 1940	3923
2739	8560	Selective Service Regulations, Volume 3	October 4, 1940	3923
2740	8561	Selective Service Regulations, Volume 5	October 4, 1940	3935
2741	8562	Exemption of James L. Hughes from Compulsory Retirement for Age	October 8, 1940	
2742	8563	Amendment of Subdivision VII, Schedule A, Civil Service Rules	October 8, 1940	4049
2743	8564	Amendment of Executive Order No. 8257 of September 21, 1939, Authorizing Excepted Appointments to Meet Public Exigency	October 8, 1940	4049
2744	8565	Amendment of Executive Order No. 8389 of April 10, 1940, as Amended	October 10, 1940	4062
2745	8566	Amending the Foreign Service Regulations of the United States	October 15, 1940	4107
2746	8567	Providing for the Administration of the Act Entitled "An Act to Authorize the President to Requisition Certain Articles and Materials for the Use of the United States, and for Other Purposes"	October 15, 1940	4121
2747	8568	Establishing the St. Lawrence Advisory Committee and Providing for a Preliminary Investigation of International Rapids Section, St. Lawrence River	October 16, 1940	4121
2748	8569	Designating the Director of Selective Service to Perform Certain Duties and Functions Under the Selective Training and Service Act of 1940	October 17, 1940	4121
2749	8570	Selective Service Regulations, Volume 6	October 18, 1940	4164
2750	8571	Transfer of Control and Jurisdiction Over Certain Lands from the Secretary of Agriculture to the Secretary of the Interior; Oklahoma	October 19, 1940	4187
2751	8572	Authorizing the Priorities Board and the Administration of Priorities to Perform Certain Functions Under Section 2 (a) of the Act of June 28, 1940	October 21, 1940	4199
2752	8573	Reserving Public Land for Town-Site Purposes; Alaska	October 21, 1940	4199
2753	8574	Selective Service Regulations, Volume 4	October 22, 1940	4209
2754	8575	Establishing the Thief Valley National Wildlife Refuge; Oregon	October 22, 1940	4213
2755	8576	Labor Regulations	October 29, 1940	4311
2756	8577	Withdrawing Public Land for Use of the War Department; Alaska	October 29, 1940	4313
2757	8578	Withdrawal of Public Land for Use of the War Department as an Aerial Bombing and Gunnery Range; Nevada	October 29, 1940	4313
2758	8579	Withdrawal of Public Land for Use of the War Department as an Aerial Bombing and Gunnery Range; Utah	October 29, 1940	4314
2759	8580	Extension of Trust Periods on Indian Lands Expiring During Calendar Year 1941	October 29, 1940	4314
2760	8581	Exemption of Andrew McClellan from Compulsory Retirement for Age	October 31, 1940	
2761	8582	Exemption of Hervey G. Mooney from Compulsory Retirement for Age	October 31, 1940	
2762	8583	Partial Revocation of Executive Order No. 5836 of July 12, 1932, Withdrawing Public Lands	November 1, 1940	4343
2763	8584	Exemption of Frank Burke from Compulsory Retirement for Age	November 7, 1940	
2764	8585	Amending Paragraph 7, Subdivision I, Schedule A of the Civil Service Rules	November 7, 1940	4425
2765	8586	Authorizing the Inspection by Receivers, and Trustees in Bankruptcy, and Their Duly Constituted Attorneys in Fact, of Certain Returns Made Under the Internal Revenue Code and of Income, Excess-Profits, and Capital Stock Tax Returns Filed Under the Revenue Act of 1938 or Prior Revenue Acts, Gift Tax Returns Filed After June 16, 1933, and Returns Under Title IX of the Social Security Act	November 7, 1940	4444
2766	8587	Amending Certain Provisions of the Civil Service Rules	November 7, 1940	4445
2767	8588	Prescribing Regulations Governing the Payment of Expenses of Transportation of Household Goods and Personal Effects of Certain Civilian Officers and Employees of the United States	November 7, 1940	4448
2768	8589	Modifying Executive Order of October 27, 1914, Creating Power Site Reserve No. 461	November 7, 1940	4449
2769	8590	Fixing the Number of Men to Be Inducted Into the Land Forces of the United States Prior to July 1, 1941, and Directing Their Selection and Induction	November 8, 1940	4449
2770	8591	Withdrawal of Public Land in Aid of Flood Control; Arkansas	November 8, 1940	4450
2771	8592	Changing the Name of the Lake Bowdoin Migratory Waterfowl Refuge to Bowdoin National Wildlife Refuge and Adding Certain Lands Thereto; Montana	November 12, 1940	4478
2772	8593	Prescribing Regulations Governing the Enforcement of the Neutrality of the United States	November 15, 1940	4525
2773	8594	Ordering Certain Units and Members of the National Guard of the United States Into the Active Military Service of the United States	November 16, 1940	4557
2774	8595	Amendment of Executive Order No. 8502 of August 3, 1940, Prescribing Regulations Governing the Grades and Ratings of Enlisted Men of the Regular Army for the Fiscal Year 1941	November 18, 1940	4558
2775	8596	Modifying Executive Order No. 3825 of April 14, 1923, and Setting Apart Certain Lands for Aviation Field Purposes; Alaska	November 18, 1940	4558
2776	8597	Establishing Sitka Naval Airspace Reservation and Kodiak Naval Airspace Reservation; Alaska	November 18, 1940	4559
2777	8598	Reserving Certain Public Lands as Administrative Sites for the Cabeza Prieta Game Range and the Kofa Game Range; Arizona	November 18, 1940	4559
2778	8599	Transferring the Use, Possession, and Control of Certain Property to the Tennessee Valley Authority; Mississippi	November 18, 1940	4559
2779	8600	Changing the Name of the Minidoka Wildlife Refuge to Minidoka National Wildlife Refuge and Adding Certain Lands Thereto; Idaho	November 20, 1940	4623
2780	8601	Enlarging the Mud Lake National Wildlife Refuge; Minnesota	November 20, 1940	4623
2781	8602	Extending the Period of Eligibility on Civil Service Registers of Persons Who Serve in the Armed Forces of the United States	November 25, 1940	4673
2782	8603	Exemption of James C. Wynde from Compulsory Retirement for Age	November 26, 1940	
2783	8604	Partial Revocation of Certain Executive Orders Creating Public Water Reserves	November 30, 1940	4771
2784	8605	Ordering Certain Units and Members of the National Guard of the United States Into the Active Military Service of the United States	November 30, 1940	4795
2785	8606	Definition of Noncombatant Training and Service	December 6, 1940	4887
2786	8606-A	Amendment of Executive Order No. 7972 of September 15, 1938, Prescribing Currency Exchange Rates in Luxemberg	December 6, 1940	
2787	8607	Prescribing Regulations Governing the Exportation of Articles and Materials Designated in the President's Proclamation of December 10, 1940, Issued Pursuant to the Provisions of Section 6 of the Act of Congress Approved July 2, 1940	December 10, 1940	4903
2788	8608	Appointment of Mary Elizabeth Huber to Franklin D. Roosevelt Library Without Regard to Civil Service Rules	December 11, 1940	
2789	8609	Exemption of Arthur W. Exline from Compulsory Retirement for Age	December 11, 1940	
2790	8610	Exemption of Roberta L. Lindsey from Compulsory Retirement for Age	December 11, 1940	
2791	8611	Exemption of Acheson F. Hassan from Compulsory Retirement for Age	December 15, 1940	
2792	8612	Amendment of Executive Order No. 8572 of October 21, 1940, Authorizing the Priorities Board and the Administrator of Priorities to Perform Certain Functions Under Section 2(a) of the Act of June 28, 1940	December 15, 1940	5143
2793	8613	Excusing Federal Employees from Duty on December 24, 1940	December 16, 1940	5143
2794	8614	Authorizing Initial Appointments to the Positions of Director and Assistant Director of the Bureau of Water Carriers of the Interstate Commerce Commission Without Compliance With the Service Rules	December 18, 1940	5143
2795	8615	Exemption of Maurice A. Emerson from Compulsory Retirement for Age	December 19, 1940	
2796	8616	Placing Palmyra Island, Territory of Hawaii, Under the Control and Jurisdiction of the Secretary of the Navy	December 19, 1940	5215
2797	8617	Prescribing Regulations Governing the Exportation of Articles and Materials Designated in the President's Proclamation of December 20, 1940, Issued Pursuant to the Provisions of Section 6 of the Act of Congress Approved July 2, 1940	December 20, 1940	5230
2798	8618	Ordering Certain Units and Members of the National Guard of the United States Into the Active Military Service of the United States	December 23, 1940	5255
2799	8619	Designating the Director of Selective Service to Perform Certain Functions and Duties Under the Selective Training and Service Act of 1940	December 23, 1940	5255
2800	8620	Amending Subdivision IX of Schedule A of the Civil Service Rules \	December 23, 1940	5256
2801	8621	Revoking in Part Proclamation No. 1519 of April 16, 1919, and Reserving Certain Lands for Aviation Purposes; Alaska	December 27, 1940	5275
2802	8622	Reserving Certain Public Lands in Connection With the Squaw Creek Antelope Range and Wildlife Refuge; Washington	December 27, 1940	5275
2803	8623	Suspension of Eight-Hour Law as to Persons Employed by the Government in the Construction of Certain Army and Navy Bases in British Possessions in the Atlantic Ocean	December 31, 1940	13
2804	8624	Making Certain Changes in the Organization of Customs Collection District No. 26 (Arizona)	December 31, 1940	13

=== 1941 ===
Relative No.	Absolute No.	Title / Description	Date signed	FR Citation
2805	8625	Exemption of Frank Frayser from Compulsory Retirement for Age	January 4, 1941	
2806	8626	Exemption of Henry L. Schmidt from Compulsory Retirement for Age	January 4, 1941	
2807	8627	Ordering Certain Units and Members of the National Guard of the United States Into the Active Military Service of the United States	January 4, 1941	117
2808	8628	Exemption of Walter C. Mendenhall from Compulsory Retirement for Age	January 4, 1941	
2809	8629	Establishing the Office of Production Management in the Executive Office of the President and Defining Its Functions and Duties	January 7, 1941	191
2810	8630	Exemption of David D. Caldwell from Compulsory Retirement for Age	January 7, 1941	
2811	8631	Prescribing Regulations Governing the Exportation of Articles and Materials Designated in the President's Proclamation of January 10, 1941, Issued Pursuant to the Provisions of Section 6 of the Act of Congress Approved July 2, 1940, and Amending Regulations of July 2, 1940, Covering the Exportation of Certain Articles and Materials	January 10, 1941	293
2812	8632	Coordination of National Defense Housing	January 11, 1941	295
2813	8633	Ordering Certain Units and Members of the National Guard of the United States Into the Active Military Service of the United States	January 14, 1941	415, 729
2814	8634	Authorizing Certain Employees in the Public Buildings Administration, Federal Works Agency, to Acquire a Classified Civil Service Status, or an Unclassified Status Under the Labor Regulations	January 14, 1941	416
2815	8635	Partial Revocation of Executive Order of July 9, 1910, Creating Coal Land Withdrawal, Montana No. 1	January 14, 1941	417
2816	8636	Withdrawal of Public Lands for the Use of the War Department; Nevada	January 14, 1941	417, 729
2817	8637	Exemption of Joshua G. Hefty from Compulsory Retirement for Age	January 14, 1941	
2818	8638	Authorizing Certain Employees of the Rural Electrification Administration to Acquire a Competitive Classified Status	January 14, 1941	455
2819	8639	Revoking the Designation of Unalaska, Alaska, as a Customs Port of Entry	January 14, 1941	455
2820	8640	Additional Regulations Governing the Exportation of Articles and Materials Described in Certain Proclamations of the President	January 15, 1941	455
2821	8641	Amending Section VIII, Volume One of the Selective Service Regulations	January 18, 1941	563
2822	8642	Modification of Executive Order No. 8442 of June 12, 1940, Reserving Certain Public Lands for Town-site Purposes; Alaska	January 21, 1941	564, 582
2823	8643	Amendment of Executive Order No. 7302 of February 21, 1936, Transferring Certain Lands to the Control and Jurisdiction of the Secretary of the Navy	January 21, 1941	581
2824	8644	Establishing the Evanston National Wildlife Refuge; Wyoming	January 21, 1941	582
2825	8645	Establishing the Kit Carson National Wildlife Refuge; Colorado	January 22, 1941	591
2826	8646	Establishing the San Andres National Wildlife Refuge; New Mexico	January 22, 1941	592
2827	8647	Establishing the Havasu Lake National Wildlife Refuge; Arizona and California	January 22, 1941	592, 771
2828	8648	Changing the Name of the Killcohook Migratory Bird Refuge to Killcohook National Wildlife Refuge and Adding Certain Lands Thereto; Delaware and New Jersey	January 23, 1941	599
2829	8649	Withdrawing Public Land for the Use of the Department of State; New Mexico	January 23, 1941	599
2830	8650	Changing the Name of the Kellys Slough Migratory Waterfowl Refuge to Kellys Slough National Wildlife Refuge and Adding Certain Lands Thereto	January 23, 1941	599
2831	8651	Withdrawal of the Public Lands for the Use of the War Department; Oregon	January 23, 1941	600
2832	8652	Reserving Public Lands for the Use of the War Department; Utah	January 28, 1941	655
2833	8653	Mrs. Florence Bankhead Appointed Chief of National Memorials and Historic Sites, National Park Service	January 28, 1941	
2834	8654	Revoking the Designation of Molson, Washington, as a Customs Port of Entry	January 29, 1941	705
2835	8655	Revoking in Part Executive Order No. 8344 of February 10, 1940, and Reserving Public Land for Use as an Addition to an Air Navigation Site; Alaska	727	
2836	8656	Exemption of Ovilup H. George from Compulsory Retirement for Age	February 3, 1941	
2837	8657	Extending the Classification Act of 1923, as Amended, to Certain Positions in the Navy Department and Establishing a Salary Differential Therefore	February 3, 1941	769
2838	8658	Establishing the Prairie Lake National Wildlife Refuge; North Dakota	February 3, 1941	769
2839	8659	Establishing the Pretty Rock National Wildlife Refuge; North Dakota	February 3, 1941	770
2840	8660	Establishing the Snyder Lake National Wildlife Refuge; North Dakota	February 3, 1941	770
2841	8661	Establishing the Springwater National Wildlife Refuge; North Dakota	February 3, 1941	770
2842	8662	Establishing the Stewart Lake National Wildlife Refuge; North Dakota	February 3, 1941	770
2843	8663	Establishing Stoney Slough National Wildlife Refuge; North Dakota	February 3, 1941	771
2844	8664	Establishing the Sunburst Lake National Wildlife Refuge; North Dakota	February 3, 1941	771
2845	8665	Establishing Tomahawk National Wildlife Refuge; North Dakota	February 3, 1941	771
2846	8666	Establishing White Lake National Wildlife Refuge; North Dakota	February 3, 1941	771
2847	8667	Establishing the Wintering River National Wildlife Refuge; North Dakota	February 3, 1941	771
2848	8668	Prescribing Regulations Governing the Exportation of Articles and Materials Designated in the President's Proclamation of February 4, 1941, Issued Pursuant to Section 6 of the Act of Congress Approved July 2, 1940, and Amending Regulations of January 15, 1941, Covering the Exportation of Certain Articles and Materials	February 4, 1941	781
2849	8669	Prescribing Regulations Governing the Exportation of Articles and Materials Designated in Proclamation No. 2449 of December 10, 1940	February 4, 1941	782, 937
2850	8670	Exemption of Clarence E. Ingling from Compulsory Retirement for Age	February 4, 1941	
2851	8671	Authorizing the Procurement Division to Use Tungsten Ore Acquired Pursuant to the Act of June 7, 1939	February 4, 1941	805
2852	8672	Amending the Foreign Service Regulations of the United States	February 4, 1941	805
2853	8673	Designating the Robert Fechner Memorial Forest; Virginia	February 5, 1941	831
2854	8674	Amendment of Executive Order No. 7293 of February 14, 1936, as Amended, Prescribing Regulations Governing the Granting of Allowances for Quarters and Subsistence to Enlisted Men	February 6, 1941	831
2855	8675	Authorizing the Director of Selective Service to Establish or Designate Work of National Importance Under Civilian Direction for Persons Conscientiously Opposed to Combatant and Non-Combatant Service in the Land or Naval Forces of the United States	February 6, 1941	831
2856	8676	Exemption of Alexander W. Weddel from Compulsory Retirement for Age	February 7, 1941	
2857	8677	Employment of the Land and Naval Forces in the Control of Vessels in the Territorial Waters of the United States and the Canal Zone	February 11, 1941	935
2858	8678	Placing Certain Lands Under the Control and Jurisdiction of the Navy Department, the War Department, and the United States Public Health Service; Puerto Rico	February 11, 1941	935
2859	8679	Authorizing Initial Appointments to the Positions of Assistant Director of the Naval Civilian Police Corps of the Navy Department Without Compliance With the Civil Service Rules	February 13, 1941	959
2860	8680	Establishing Naval Defensive Sea Areas Around and Naval Airspace Reservations Over the Islands of Kiska and Unalaska; Alaska	February 14, 1941	1014
2861	8681	Establishing Kaneohe Bay Naval Defensive Sea Area and Kaneohe Bay Naval Airspace Reservation; Hawaii	February 14, 1941	1014
2862	8682	Establishing Naval Defensive Sea Areas Around and Naval Airspace Reservations Over the Islands of Palmyra, Johnston, Midway, Wake, and Kingman Reef; Pacific Ocean	February 14, 1941	1015
2863	8683	Establishing Naval Defensive Sea Areas Around and Naval Airspace Reservations Over the Islands of Rose, Tutuila, and Guam; Pacific Ocean	February 14, 1941	1015
2864	8684	Establishing Culebra Island Naval Defensive Sea Area and Culebra Island Naval Airspace Reservation; Puerto Rico	February 14, 1941	1016
2865	8685	Establishing the Imperial National Wildlife Refuge; Arizona and California	February 14, 1941	1016
2866	8686	Certain Personnel Transferred from U.S. Maritime Commission to Interstate Commerce Commission	February 17, 1941	
2867	8687	Amending Subdivision XIX of Schedule A of the Civil Service Rules	February 17, 1941	1063
2868	8688	Prescribing Regulations Governing the Granting of Allowances for Quarters to Certain Enlisted Men of the Army of the United States	February 19, 1941	1083
2869	8689	Amending the Foreign Service Regulations of the United States	February 19, 1941	1083
2870	8690	Exemption of John M. Terwilliger from Compulsory Retirement for Age	February 19, 1941	
2871	8691	Withdrawal of Public Land for Forest Lookout Station; Oregon	February 20, 1941	1111
2872	8692	Exemption of Edgar M. Cohee from Compulsory Retirement for Age	February 21, 1941	
2873	8693	Prescribing Regulations Governing the Exportation of Articles and Materials Designated in the President's Proclamation 2460 of February 25, 1941, Issued Pursuant to Section 6 of the Act of Congress Approved July 2, 1940, and Amending Regulations of January 15, 1941, Covering the Exportation of Certain Articles and Materials	February 25, 1941	1156
2874	8694	Prescribing Regulations Governing the Exportation of Articles and Materials Designated in the President's Proclamation 2461 of February 25, 1941, Issued Pursuant to Section 6 of the Act of Congress Approved July 2, 1940, and Amending Regulations of January 15, 1941, Covering the Exportation of Certain Articles and Materials	February 25, 1941	1157
2875	8695	Extending the Limits of the Customs Port of Entry of Jonesport, Maine, in Customs Collection District No. 1 (Maine and New Hampshire)	February 25, 1941	1187
2876	8696	Transfer of Certain Lands from the Secretary of Agriculture to the Secretary of the Interior; New Mexico	February 28, 1941	1229
2877	8697	Transfer of Certain Lands from the Secretary of the Interior to the Secretary of Agriculture; New Mexico	February 28, 1941	1230
2878	8698	Exemption of Harry L. Mickey from Compulsory Retirement for Age	March 1, 1941	−N/P−
2879	8699	Covering Certain Positions in the Federal Deposit Insurance Corporation Into the Competitive Classified Civil Service, and Authorizing Certain Employees of That Corporation to Acquire a Classified Civil Service Status	March 1, 1941	1285
2880	8700	Revocation of Executive Order No. 6667 of April 5, 1934, Withdrawing Public Lands; Colorado, 1941	March 3, 1941	1285
2881	8701	Amendment of Executive Order No. 8389 of April 10, 1940, as Amended, 1941	March 4, 1941	1285
2882	8702	Prescribing Regulations Governing the Exportation of Articles and Materials Designated in the President's Proclamation 2463 of March 4, 1941, Issued Pursuant to Section 6 of the Act of Congress Approved July 2, 1940, and Amending Regulations of January 15, 1941, Covering the Exportation of Certain Articles and Materials, 1941, 1941, 1941	March 4, 1941	1301
2883	8703	Prescribing Regulations Governing the Exportation of Articles and Materials Designated in the President's Proclamation 2464 of March 4, 1941, Issued Pursuant to Section 6 of the Act of Congress Approved July 2, 1940, and Amending Regulations of January 15, 1941, Covering the Exportation of Certain Articles and Materials, 1941, 1941, 1941	March 4, 1941	1302
2884	8704	Regulations Governing the Granting of Allowances for Quarters and Subsistence to Enlisted Men	March 4, 1941	1302
2885	8705	Amending Certain Provisions of the Civil Service Rules	March 5, 1941	1313
2886	8706	Amending Paragraph 12 of Executive Order No. 5865 of June 27, 1932, Prescribing Regulations Relating to Aerial Flights by Personnel of the Army, Navy, Marine Corps, Coast Guard, and National Guard, 1941	March 6, 1941	1333
2887	8707	Amending Certain Provisions of the Civil Service Rules	March 10, 1941	1399
2888	8708	Reserving Certain Public Lands in Connection With the Independence County Wildlife Refuge; Arkansas	March 10, 1941	1399
2889	8709	Changing the Name of the Wyoming National Forest to Bridger National Forest; Wyoming	March 10, 1941	1400
2890	8710	Exemption of Ales Hrdlicka from Compulsory Retirement for Age	March 12, 1941	−N/P−
2891	8711	Amendment of Executive Order No. 8389 of April 10, 1940, as Amended, 1941	March 13, 1941	1443
2892	8712	Prescribing Regulations Governing the Exportation of Articles and Materials Designated in Proclamations Issued Pursuant to the Provisions of Section 6 of the Act of Congress Approved July 2, 1940, 1941	March 15, 1941	1501
2893	8713	Prescribing Regulations Governing the Exportation of Articles and Materials Designated in Proclamation No. 2465 of March 4, 1941, Issued Pursuant to the Provisions of Section 6 of the Act of Congress Approved July 2, 1940, 1941, 1941	March 15, 1941	1502
2894	8714	Designating Certain Officers to Act as Secretary of the Treasury in Case of Absence or Sickness of the Secretary	March 18, 1941	1517
2895	8715	Amendment of Chapter XIII of Executive Order No. 4314 of September 25, 1925, Establishing Rules Governing Navigation of the Panama Canal and Adjacent Waters, 1941	March 18, 1941	1531
2896	8716	Establishment of National Defense Mediation Board	March 19, 1941	1532
2897	8717	Establishing Kodiak Island Naval Defensive Sea Area; Alaska	March 22, 1941	1621
2898	8718	Establishing Subic Bay Naval Defensive Sea Area and Subic Bay Naval Airspace Reservation; Philippine Islands	March 22, 1941	1621
2899	8719	Suspending Certain Statutory Provisions Relating to Employment in the Canal Zone	March 22, 1941	1622
2900	8720	Appointment of Watson B. Miller as Assistant Administrator of Federal Security Agency Without Regard to Civil Service Rules	March 22, 1941	−N/P−
2901	8721	Amendment of Executive Order No. 8389 of April 10, 1940, as Amended, 1941	March 24, 1941	1622
2902	8722	Modifying Executive Order of December 12, 1917, Creating Power Site Reserve No. 659, Coast Streams in Western Oregon, 1941	March 28, 1941	1704
2903	8723	Power Site Restoration No. 494, Partial Revocation of Executive Order of December 12, 1917, Creating Power Site Reserve No. 659; Oregon, 1941	March 28, 1941	1705
2904	8724	Restoring Lands of the Homestead Field Military Reservation to the Use of the Territory of Hawaii	March 29, 1941	1765
2905	8725	Withdrawing Public Land for Use of the War Department; Florida	March 29, 1941	1765
2906	8726	Exemption of Harry U. Wagner from Compulsory Retirement for Age	March 29, 1941	−N/P−
2907	8727	Amending Paragraphs 104b and 104c, Manual for Courts-Martial, United States Army, Relating to Limitations on Punishments	April 1, 1941	1765
2908	8728	Exemption of Ernest C. Steward from Compulsory Retirement for Age	April 2, 1941	−N/P−
2909	8729	Correcting Executive Order Nos. 8680, 8682, and 8683 of February 14, 1941, Establishing Certain Naval Defensive Sea Areas and Naval Airspace Reservations, 1941	April 2, 1941	1792
2910	8730	Amendment of Subdivision IX, Schedule B, Civil Service Rules	April 2, 1941	1792
2911	8731	Amending Executive Order No. 8716 to Provide for the Appointment of Alternate Members of the National Defense Mediation Board	April 4, 1941	1809
2912	8732	Withdrawing Public Land in Aid of Flood Control; Arkansas	April 8, 1941	1906
2913	8733	Withdrawing Public Land in Aid of Flood Control, Oklahoma	April 10, 1941	1906
2914	8734	Establishing the Office of Price Administration and Civilian Supply in the Executive Office of the President and Defining Its Functions and Duties	April 11, 1941	1917
2915	8735	Authorizing Certain Employees of Federal Security Agency to Acquire a Competitive Classified Status Without Regard to Civil Service Rules	April 14, 1941	−N/P−
2916	8736	Partial Revocation of Executive Order No. 5214 of October 30, 1929, Withdrawing Public Lands for Naval Purposes; Alaska, 1941	April 14, 1941	1984
2917	8737	Fort Gulick Military Reservation; Canal Zone	April 16, 1941	2012
2918	8738	Allocating the Quota Under the Inter-American Coffee Agreement for Countries Not Signatories of the Agreement	April 21, 1941	2047
2919	8739	Revoking Executive Order No. 6802 of August 4, 1934, and Withdrawing the Land Described Therein for the Use of the Alaska Game Commission; Alaska, 1941	April 21, 1941	2047
2920	8740	Covering Certain Positions Into the Competitive Classified Civil Service and Amending Schedule A of the Civil Service Rules	April 22, 1941	2116
2921	8741	Revocation of Executive Order No. 5623 of May 15, 1931, Withdrawing Public Lands; California, 1941	April 23, 1941	2116
2922	8742	Partial Revocation of Executive Order of July 9, 1910, Creating Coal Land Withdrawal, Montana No. 93, 1941	April 23, 1941	2116
2923	8743	Extending the Classified Civil Service	April 23, 1941	2117
2924	8744	Authorizing Certain Employees of the Government to Acquire a Classified Civil Service Status	April 24, 1941	2118
2925	8745	Exemption of Charley R. Davis from Compulsory Retirement for Age	April 24, 1941	−N/P−
2926	8746	Amendment of Executive Order No. 8389 of April 10, 1940, as Amended, 1941	April 28, 1941	2187
2927	8747	Exemption of Louis A. Simon from Compulsory Retirement for Age	April 28, 1941	−N/P−
2928	8748	Approving Regulations of the Civil Service Commission Relating to Efficiency-Rating Boards of Review	May 1, 1941	2251
2929	8749	Establishing Guantanamo Bay Naval Defensive Sea Area and Guantanamo Bay Naval Airspace Reservation; Cuba	May 1, 1941	2252
2930	8750	Exemption of Alphonso L. Graham from Compulsory Retirement for Age	May 2, 1941	−N/P−
2931	8751	Establishing the Division of Defense Aid Reports in the Office for Emergency Management of the Executive Office of the President	May 2, 1941	2301
2932	8752	Amendment of Executive Order No. 8712 of March 15, 1941, Prescribing Regulations Governing the Exportation of Articles and Materials Designated in Proclamations Issued Pursuant to the Provisions of Section 6 of the Act of Congress Approved July 2, 1940, 1941, 1941	May 6, 1941	2333
2933	8753	Amendment of Section 60 of the Regulations Governing Highways, Vehicles, and Vehicular Traffic in the Canal Zone	May 13, 1941	2439
2934	8754	Exemption of Frederick A. Sterling from Compulsory Retirement for Age	May 14, 1941	−N/P−
2935	8755	Withdrawing Public Lands for Use of the War Department as a Demolition and Practice Bombing Range; Alaska	May 16, 1941	2473
2936	8756	Amendment of Executive Order No. 8633 of January 14, 1941, Ordering Certain Units and Members of the National Guard of the United States Into the Active Military Service of the United States, 1941	May 17, 1941	2474
2937	8757	Establishing the Office of Civilian Defense in the Office for Emergency Management of the Executive Office of the President	May 20, 1941	2517
2938	8758	Establishing Conversion Factors for Use in Administering Quotas on Imports of Coffee	May 21, 1941	2535
2939	8759	Amendment of Executive Order No. 8704 of March 4, 1941, Prescribing Regulations Governing the Granting of Allowances for Quarters and Subsistence to Enlisted Men, 1941	May 24, 1941	2600
2940	8760	Restricting the Eligibility of Federal Employees to Take Civil Service Examinations and to be Certified	May 27, 1941	2618
2941	8761	Exemption of Edward P. Davis from Compulsory Retirement for Age	May 27, 1941	−N/P−
2942	8762	Exemption of Frank L. Hess from Compulsory Retirement for Age	May 27, 1941	−N/P−
2943	8763	Establishing the Necedah Wildlife Management Area; Wisconsin	May 28, 1941	2674
2944	8764	Appointment of John H. Dillon as Junior Administrative Officer to Secretary of the Navy	June 3, 1941	−N/P−
2945	8765	Appointment of Alexander H. Knauss as Junior Historical Aide, Vanderbilt Mansion, National Park Service	June 3, 1941	−N/P−
2946	8766	Documents Required of Aliens Entering the United States	June 3, 1941	2741
2947	8767	Directing Certain Personnel of the Coast Guard to Operate as a Part of the Navy, Subject to the Orders of the Secretary of the Navy	June 3, 1941	2743
2948	8768	Amendment of Paragraph 6, Subdivision VI, Schedule A of the Civil Service Rules	June 3, 1941	2743
2949	8769	Transfers of Lands Between the Department of Agriculture and the Department of the Interior; Florida	June 3, 1941	2743
2950	8770	Establishing the Lake Mason National Wildlife Refuge; Montana	June 3, 1941	2743
2951	8771	Authorizing the United States Maritime Commission to Take Over Certain Foreign Merchant Vessels	June 6, 1941	2759
2952	8772	Exemption of Clarence H. Branscombe from Compulsory Retirement for Age	June 7, 1941	−N/P−
2953	8773	Authorizing and Directing the Secretary of War to Take Possession of and Operate the Inglewood Plant of North American Aviation, Inc.	June 9, 1941	2777
2954	8774	Modifying Executive Order No. 8738 of April 21, 1941, Allocating by Types the Coffee Quota for Countries Not Signatories of the Inter-American Coffee Agreement, 1941	June 10, 1941	2845
2955	8775	Amendment of Executive Order No. 7302 of February 21, 1936, Transferring Certain Lands to the Control and Jurisdiction of the Secretary of the Navy; Virgin Islands, 1941	June 10, 1941	2846
2956	8776	Withdrawal of Public Land for Radio Relay Station for Use in Forest Protection; California	June 10, 1941	2846
2957	8777	Appointment of Dr. Harold C. Bryant as Superintendent, Grand Canyon National Park, Interior Department	June 11, 1941	−N/P−
2958	8778	Exemption of Percy Nicholls from Compulsory Retirement for Age	June 11, 1941	−N/P−
2959	8779	Excluding a Tract of Land from the Tongass National Forest and Restoring it to Entry; Alaska	June 11, 1941	2867
2960	8780	Withdrawing Public Lands for the Use of the Department of State; New Mexico	June 11, 1941	2867
2961	8781	Requiring Employees in the Executive Civil Service to be Fingerprinted	June 12, 1941	2895
2962	8782	Establishing a Military Reservation on Certain Islands in Gatun Lake, Canal Zone	June 12, 1941	2896
2963	8783	Withdrawal of Public Lands: Public Water Reserve No. 162; California	June 12, 1941	2897
2964	8784	Partial Revocation of Certain Executive Orders Creating Public Water Reserves: Public Water Restoration No. 88; California and New Mexico	June 13, 1941	2897
2965	8785	Regulating Transactions in Foreign Exchange and Foreign-Owned Property, Providing for the Reporting of All Foreign-Owned Property, and Related Matters	June 14, 1941	2897
2966	8786	Withdrawal of Public Lands for the Use of the Navy Department for Naval Aviation Purposes; Alaska	June 14, 1941	2941
2967	8787	Revoking Executive Order No. 3151 of August 16, 1919, and Restoring the Land Affected Thereby to Its Former Status; Alaska, 1941	June 14, 1941	2941
2968	8788	Withdrawing Public Land for Use of the War Department; Alaska	June 14, 1941	2941
2969	8789	Revoking in Part Executive Order No. 8344, of February 10, 1940, and Reserving Public Lands for the Use of the War Department; Alaska, 1941	June 14, 1941	2942
2970	8790	Withdrawing Public Lands for Use of the Department of the Navy; California	June 14, 1941	2942
2971	8791	Withdrawing Public Lands for Use of the Department of the Navy; California	June 14, 1941	2943
2972	8792	Withdrawing Public Lands for Use of the War Department; Florida	June 14, 1941	2943
2973	8793	Withdrawing Public Lands for the Use of the War Department; Oklahoma	June 14, 1941	2943
2974	8794	Withdrawing Public Lands for Use of the War Department; Oregon	June 14, 1941	2943
2975	8795	Modifying Executive Order of December 12, 1917, Creating Power Site Reserve No. 661; Willamette River Tributaries, Oregon, 1941	June 16, 1941	2943
2976	8796	Exemption of George Cook from Compulsory Retirement for Age	June 18, 1941	−N/P−
2977	8797	Suspension of Eight-Hour Law as to Mechanics and Laborers Employed by the War Department in the Construction of Public Works Necessary for the National Defense in the Canal Zone, Puerto Rico, and the Territory of Alaska	June 18, 1941	3019
2978	8798	Transferring Certain Vessels Between the Navy Department and the Department of Commerce, Coast and Geodetic Survey	June 19, 1941	3049
2979	8799	Enlarging the Volunteer Participation Committee of the Office of Civilian Defense	June 20, 1941	3049
2980	8800	Amendment of Regulations Concerning Foreign Service Pay Adjustment	June 22, 1941	3097
2981	8801	Exemption of Archie W. Davis from Compulsory Retirement for Age	June 24, 1941	−N/P−
2982	8802	Reaffirming Policy of Full Participation in the Defense Program by All Persons, Regardless of Race, Creed, Color, or National Origin, and Directing Certain Action in Furtherance of Said Policy	June 25, 1941	3109
2983	8803	Amending Schedule A of the Civil Service Rules	June 25, 1941	3109
2984	8804	Exemption of James E. Harper from Compulsory Retirement for Age	June 25, 1941	−N/P−
2985	8805	Exemption of Samuel A. Cottrell from Compulsory Retirement for Age	June 25, 1941	−N/P−
2986	8806	Fixing the Number of Men to be Inducted Into the Land Forces of the United States Between July 1, 1941, and June 30, 1942, and Directing Their Selection and Induction, 1941, 1941	June 28, 1941	3207
2987	8807	Establishing the Office of Scientific Research and Development in the Executive Office of the President and Defining Its Functions and Duties	June 28, 1941	3207
2988	8808	American Defense Service Medal	June 28, 1941	3209
2989	8809	Good Conduct Medal	June 28, 1941	3209
2990	8810	Exemption of Hurbert K. Bishop from Compulsory Retirement for Age	June 30, 1941	−N/P−
2991	8811	Authorizing the Continuance in Employment of Persons Employed by the Office of Government Reports on June 30, 1941, and the Conferring of a Competitive Classified Civil Service Status Upon Such Employees, 1941	June 30, 1941	3223
2992	8812	Suspending Certain Statutory Provisions Relating to Employment in the Canal Zone	June 30, 1941	3223
2993	8813	Power Site Restoration No. 495. Partial Revocation of Executive Order of November 22, 1924, Creating Power Site Reserve No. 759; New Mexico, 1941	July 1, 1941	3253
2994	8814	Directing the Secretary of War to Relinquish Possession of the Inglewood Plant of North American Aviation, Inc.	July 2, 1941	3253
2995	8815	Revoking the Designation of Lancaster, Minnesota, as a Customs Port of Entry	July 5, 1941	3265
2996	8816	Suspending the Provisions of the Saturday Half-Holiday Act of March 3, 1931, as to Certain Employees of the Government, 1941	July 5, 1941	3265
2997	8817	Prescribing Regulations Governing Vacation Pay for Field Service Employees of the War Department, the Navy Department, the Coast Guard, and the Panama Canal Who Forego Vacations During the Emergency	July 5, 1941	3265
2998	8818	Amending the Foreign Service Regulations of the United States	July 5, 1941	−N/P−
2999	8819	Excluding Land from the Humboldt National Forest and Reserving it for Townsite Purposes; Nevada	July 5, 1941	3313
3000	8820	Amending the Foreign Service Regulations of the United States	July 11, 1941	3421
3001	8821	Reserving Public Land for Use of the Department of the Navy for Naval Aviation Purposes; Nevada	July 16, 1941	3529
3002	8822	Amendment of Executive Order No. 8757 of May 20, 1941, Establishing the Office of Civilian Defense, 1941	July 16, 1941	3529
3003	8823	Providing for an Additional Member of the Committee on Fair Employment Practice in the Office of Production Management, Established by Section 3 of Executive Order No. 8802 of June 25, 1941, 1941	July 18, 1941	3577
3004	8824	Prescribing Regulations Governing the Grades and Ratings of Enlisted Men of the Regular Army for the Fiscal Year 1942	July 18, 1941	3577
3005	8825	Exemption of Bernard S. Kroger from Compulsory Retirement for Age	July 18, 1941	−N/P−
3006	8826	Civil Service Retirement Act Extended to James Edgar Smith, Patrick J. Farrell, and John McChord of ICC	July 18, 1941	−N/P−
3007	8827	Exemption of Harry T. Edwards from Compulsory Retirement for Age	July 24, 1941	−N/P−
3008	8828	Exemption of Louis Loebl from Compulsory Retirement for Age	July 24, 1941	−N/P−
3009	8829	Exemption of William D. Terrell from Compulsory Retirement for Age	July 24, 1941	−N/P−
3010	8830	Withdrawing Public Lands for Use of the War Department as a Training Center; California	July 24, 1941	3716
3011	8831	Withdrawing Public Land for Use of the War Department for Military Purposes; Florida	July 24, 1941	3716
3012	8832	Amendment of Executive Order No. 8389 of April 10, 1940, as Amended, 1941	July 26, 1941	3751
3013	8833	Authorizing Certain Employees of the Government to Acquire a Classified Status and Permitting Certain Positions to be Filled by Promotion, Transfer, or Assignment of Certain Employees	July 26, 1941	3761
3014	8834	Designating the Honorable Robert H. Todd, Jr., as Acting Judge of the District Court of the United States for Puerto Rico	July 26, 1941	3761
3015	8835	Exemption of Charles A. Appel from Compulsory Retirement for Age	July 29, 1941	−N/P−
3016	8836	Exemption of Paul Bartsch from Compulsory Retirement for Age	July 29, 1941	−N/P−
3017	8837	Prescribing Regulations Governing Overtime Compensation of Certain Civilian Employees of the War Department, the Navy Department, the Coast Guard, and the Panama Canal	July 30, 1941	3824
3018	8838	Amendment of Executive Order No. 8798 of June 19, 1941, Transferring Certain Vessels Between the Navy Department and the Department of Commerce, 1941	July 30, 1941	3825
3019	8839	Establishing the Economic Defense Board	July 30, 1941	3823
3020	8840	Establishing the Office of the Coordinator of Inter-American Affairs in the Executive Office of the President and Defining Its Functions and Duties	July 30, 1941	3857
3021	8841	Restoring Public Lands to Their Former Status of Being Withdrawn Under Executive Order No. 6964 of February 5, 1935, 1941	July 31, 1941	3877
3022	8842	Regulations Pertaining to Within-Grade Salary Advancements for Employees Classified Under the Salary Schedule of Executive Order No. 6746 of June 21, 1934, 1941	August 1, 1941	3877
3023	8843	Regulation of Consumer Credit	August 9, 1941	4035
3024	8844	Amendment of Exemption of Harry T. Edwards from Compulsory Retirement for Age	August 8, 1941	−N/P−
3025	8845	Revoking the Designation of Grand Rapids, Michigan, as a Customs Port of Entry	August 8, 1941	4069
3026	8846	Revoking the License Issued on December 16, 1910, Authorizing the Construction, Maintenance, and Operation of an Electric Street Railway System in the Canal Zone, 1941	August 8, 1941	4070
3027	8847	Withdrawing Public Lands for Use of the War Department as an Aerial Bombing and Gunnery Range; Alaska	August 8, 1941	4070
3028	8848	Suspension of Eight-Hour Law as to Laborers and Mechanics Employed by the War Department in the Construction Within the United States of Public Works Which Are Necessary for the National Defense	August 8, 1941	4069
3029	8849	Appointment of Margaret Patterson as Assistant Historical Aide, Andrew Johnson Monument	August 16, 1941	−N/P−
3030	8850	Authorizing the Commandant of the Coast Guard to Take Over Certain Foreign Merchant Marine Training Ships	August 16, 1941	4179
3031	8851	Transferring United States Coast Guard Ship Redwing from the United States Coast Guard to the United States Navy	August 16, 1941	4179
3032	8852	Transferring the United States Coast Guard for the District of Honolulu, Territory of Hawaii, Together With Its Organization, Personnel, and Equipment, to the Service and Jurisdiction of the Secretary of the Navy	August 16, 1941	4180
3033	8853	Establishing Manila Bay Defensive Sea Area	August 16, 1941	4180
3034	8854	Revoking Executive Order No. 8168 of June 14, 1939, and Withdrawing the Land Released Thereby and Other Land for Use of the Coast and Geodetic Survey, Department of Commerce, as a Magnetic and Seismological Observatory Site; Alaska, 1941	August 16, 1941	4181
3035	8855	Exempting Certain Positions from Salary Classification	August 16, 1941	4181
3036	8856	Authorizing the Appointment of Certain Employees in the Postal Service Without Regard to the Civil Service Rules	August 16, 1941	4181
3037	8857	Establishing the Kodiak National Wildlife Refuge; Alaska	August 19, 1941	4287
3038	8858	Transferring the Control and Jurisdiction Over Certain Land from the Secretary of the Interior to the Secretary of War; Virgin Islands	August 19, 1941	4288
3039	8859	Suspension of Eight-Hour Law as to Mechanics and Laborers Employed by the War Department in the Construction of Public Works in the Territory of Hawaii Necessary for the National Defense	August 20, 1941	4289
3040	8860	Suspending the Provisions of the Saturday Half-Holiday Act of March 3, 1931, as to Certain Employees of the Federal Government in the Territory of Hawaii, 1941	August 20, 1941	4289
3041	8861	Revocation of Executive Order Nos. 4109, 4262, and 4430 of December 8, 1924, July 3, 1925, and April 23, 1926, Respectively, Withdrawing Public Lands; Alabama, Florida, Mississippi, Michigan, and Wisconsin, 1941, 1941, 1941	August 20, 1941	4289
3042	8862	Extending the Periods of Training and Service, Active Military Service, and Enlistment of Persons in or Subject to Training and Service or Active Military Service	August 21, 1941	4319
3043	8863	Allocating the Quota Under the Inter-American Coffee Agreement for Countries Not Signatories of the Agreement	August 21, 1941	4320
3044	8864	Placing Certain Public Lands Under the Control of the Secretary of the Interior; Alaska	August 21, 1941	4320
3045	8865	Withdrawing Public Land for Use of the War Department for Combat Firing Ranges and Maneuver Purposes; California	August 21, 1941	4320
3046	8866	Exemption of J.B. Clarke from Compulsory Retirement for Age	August 22, 1941	−N/P−
3047	8867	Transferring to the Control and Jurisdiction of the Treasury Department a Certain Portion of the Military Reservation at “La Puntilla”, San Juan, Puerto Rico	August 22, 1941	4351
3048	8868	Secretary of Navy Authorized to Take Possession of Federal Shipbuilding and Drydock Company	August 23, 1941	4349
3049	8869	Waiving Compliance With Provisions of Law Relating to Masters, Officers, Members of the Crew, and Crew Accommodations on Certain Vessels	August 23, 1941	4351
3050	8870	Restoring Certain Lands Comprising Part of the Waimanalo Military Reservation to the Use of the Territory of Hawaii	August 25, 1941	4397
3051	8871	Authorizing the United States Maritime Commission to Issue Warrants With Respect to Vessels	August 26, 1941	4469
3052	8872	Withdrawing Public Lands for Use of the War Department as an Aerial Gunnery and Bombing Range; Alaska	August 27, 1941	4470
3053	8873	Exemption of Fred E. Edwards from Compulsory Retirement for Age	August 27, 1941	−N/P−
3054	8874	Withdrawing Public Lands for Use of the War Department as a Practice Bombing Range; New Mexico	August 28, 1941	4485
3055	8875	Delegation and Coordination of Priority Authority	August 28, 1941	4483
3056	8876	Suspending the Provisions of the Saturday Half-Holiday Act of March 3, 1931, to Certain Employees of the War Department and of the Coast Guard, 1941	August 29, 1941	4503
3057	8877	Withdrawing Public Lands for Use of the War Department for Military Purposes; Alaska	August 29, 1941	4504
3058	8878	Amendment of Executive Order No. 5643 of June 8, 1931, Prescribing Regulations Governing Representation and Post Allowances, 1941	August 29, 1941	4506
3059	8879	Prescribing Regulations Governing the Payment of Interest on Postal-Savings Certificates Issued by the Canal Zone Postal Service	August 30, 1941	4551
3060	8880	Amendment of Executive Order No. 9 of January 17, 1873, to Permit an Officer or Employee of the Federal Government to Hold the Office of Chancellor of the University of Puerto Rico, 1941	August 30, 1941	4551
3061	8881	Amending Executive Order No. 8771 of June 6, 1941 Entitled, “Authorizing the United States Maritime Commission to Take Over Certain Foreign Merchant Vessels”, 1941	September 2, 1941	4551
3062	8882	Regulations Governing Within-Grade Salary Requirements	September 3, 1941	4583
3063	8883	Withdrawing Public Land for Use of the Department of the Navy as an Aircraft Bombing Site; California	September 3, 1941	4585
3064	8884	Withdrawing Public Lands for Use of the War Department; California	September 3, 1941	4585
3065	8885	Revoking the Designation of Peskan, Montana, as a Customs Port of Entry	September 3, 1941	4585
3066	8886	Authorizing a Classified Civil Service Status to be Conferred Upon Certain Civilian Employees of the Coast Guard Who Were Transferred from the Bureau of Lighthouses of the Department of Commerce Under Reorganization Plan No. II	September 3, 1941	4585
3067	8887	Exemption of Certain Plate Printers at Bureau of Engraving from Compulsory Retirement for Age	September 3, 1941	−N/P−
3068	8888	Appointment of Guy J. Swope, Director, Division of Territories and Island Possessions, Department of the Interior, as Administrator of the Puerto Rico Reconstruction Administration	September 3, 1941	4601
3069	8889	Amending Regulations Governing the Exportation of Articles and Materials Designated in Proclamations Issued Pursuant to the Provisions of Section 6 of the Act of Congress Approved July 2, 1940, 1941	September 2, 1941	4601
3070	8890	Establishing the Office of Defense Health and Welfare Services in the Executive Office of the President and Defining Its Functions and Duties	September 3, 1941	4625
3071	8891	Establishing the Division of Contract Distribution in the Office of Production Management and Defining Its Functions and Duties	September 4, 1941	4623
3072	8892	Withdrawing Public Lands for Use of the War Department; Arizona	September 5, 1941	4625
3073	8893	Appointment of S. Roydon Burch to Position in Department of Agriculture Without Regard to Civil Service Rules	September 8, 1941	−N/P−
3074	8894	Amending Certain Provisions of the Civil Service Rules	September 8, 1941	4681
3075	8895	Directing Certain Units, Vessels and Personnel of the Coast Guard to Operate as Part of the Navy, Subject to the Orders of the Secretary of the Navy	September 11, 1941	4723
3076	8896	Exemption of Nelson S. Thompson from Compulsory Retirement for Age	September 12, 1941	−N/P−
3077	8897	Exemption of Augusta F. Johnston from Compulsory Retirement for Age, 1941	September 12, 1941	−N/P−
3078	8898	Appointment of Soulis Newman to a Classified Position in the Public Buildings Administration Without Regard to Civil Service Rules	September 12, 1941	−N/P−
3079	8899	Exemption of Edward D. Anderson from Compulsory Retirement for Age	September 15, 1941	−N/P−
3080	8900	Amending the Executive Order Establishing the Economic Defense Board	September 15, 1941	4795
3081	8901	Exemption of Samuel Thomas from Compulsory Retirement for Age	September 17, 1941	−N/P−
3082	8902	Prescribing Regulations Pertaining to the Entry of Coffee Into the United States from Countries Signatories of the Inter-American Coffee Agreement	September 17, 1941	4809
3083	8903	Exemption of Jules A. Rodier from Compulsory Retirement for Age	September 22, 1941	−N/P−
3084	8904	Exemption of Maurice C. Latta from Compulsory Retirement for Age	September 22, 1941	−N/P−
3085	8905	Exemption of Z. Lewis Dalby from Compulsory Retirement for Age	September 22, 1941	−N/P−
3086	8906	Transfer of Lands from the Ouachita National Forest to the Ozark National Forest; Arkansas	September 23, 1941	4877
3087	8907	Exemption of William C. Alden from Compulsory Retirement for Age	September 24, 1941	−N/P−
3088	8908	Restoring to the Government of the Commonwealth of the Philippines Lands Comprising the United States Chromite Reservation Situate in the Province of Zambales, Island of Luzon, Philippine Islands	September 25, 1941	4913
3089	8909	Authorizing the Secretary of the Treasury to Permit the Entry of Bonafide Samples of Coffee Without Regard to Quota Restrictions	September 26, 1941	4929
3090	8910	Transfer of Jurisdiction Over Certain Lands from the Secretary of Agriculture to the Secretary of the Navy; Indiana	September 27, 1941	4963
3091	8911	Withdrawal of Public Lands for Use in Connection With the Squaw Butte Experimental Station; Oregon	September 27, 1941	4963
3092	8912	Transfer of Certain Lands from the Secretary of the Interior to the Secretary of Agriculture; New Mexico	September 27, 1941	4963
3093	8913	Exemption of Rutherford H. Baker from Compulsory Retirement for Age	September 30, 1941	−N/P−
3094	8914	Amending Executive Order No. 8781 of June 12, 1941, Requiring the Fingerprinting of Employees in the Executive Civil Service, to Permit the Civil Service Commission to Exempt Any Group or Groups of Temporary Employees from the Requirements Thereof, 1941	October 1, 1941	5027
3095	8915	Withdrawing Public Lands for Use of the War Department as a Practice Bombing and Gunnery Range; Washington	October 11, 1941	5247
3096	8916	Revoking Executive Order No. 1030 of February 24, 1909, and Withdrawing Certain Public Lands for Use of the Alaska Road Commission, Department of the Interior, for Aviation Purposes; Alaska, 1941	October 11, 1941	5247
3097	8917	Exemption of James E. Amos from Compulsory Retirement for Age	October 16, 1941	−N/P−
3098	8918	Exemption of Wladimir Ayvazoglou from Compulsory Retirement for Age	October 21, 1941	−N/P−
3099	8919	Exemption of David D. Caldwell from Compulsory Retirement for Age	October 21, 1941	−N/P−
3100	8920	Reserving Certain Public Lands in Connection With the Sinlahekin Deer Winter Range and Wildlife Refuge; Washington	October 22, 1941	5442
3101	8921	Withdrawing Public Land for Use of the United States Coast Guard, Treasury Department; California	October 23, 1941	5463
3102	8922	Establishing an Office of Facts and Figures in the Office for Emergency Management in the Executive Office of the President	October 24, 1941	5477
3103	8923	Withdrawing Public Lands for the Use of the War Department as a National Guard Rifle Range; New Mexico	October 24, 1941	5477
3104	8924	Establishing the Creedman Coulee National Wildlife Refuge; Montana	October 25, 1941	5507
3105	8925	Exemption of Dr. Lawrence W. White from Compulsory Retirement for Age	October 25, 1941	−N/P−
3106	8926	Establishing the Office of Lend-Lease Administration in the Office for Emergency Management of the Executive Office of the President	October 28, 1941	5519
3107	8927	Withdrawal of Public Lands for National Defense Purposes; Nevada	October 29, 1941	5549
3108	8928	Secretary of War Authorized to Take Possession of the Bendix, New Jersey, Plants of Air Associates, Incorporated	October 30, 1941	5559
3109	8929	Directing the Coast Guard to Operate as Part of the Navy	November 1, 1941	5581
3110	8930	Establishing a National Indian Institute in the Department of the Interior	November 1, 1941	5613
3111	8931	Amendment of Paragraph 24 of Executive Order No. 1888 of February 2, 1914, as Amended, Relating to Conditions of Employment in the Panama Canal Service, 1941	November 1, 1941	5614
3112	8932	Withdrawing Public Lands for Use of the War Department; Idaho	November 5, 1941	5657
3113	8933	Exemption of Hans Schjeveland from Compulsory Retirement for Age	November 5, 1941	−N/P−
3114	8934	Exemption of Miss Laura L. Tracy from Compulsory Retirement for Age	November 5, 1941	−N/P−
3115	8935	Exemption of William H. Tietgen from Compulsory Retirement for Age	November 5, 1941	−N/P−
3116	8936	Exemption of Dr. Arthur R. Butler from Compulsory Retirement for Age	November 5, 1941	−N/P−
3117	8937	Extending the Period of Eligibility on Civil Service Registers or Lists of Persons Who Serve in the Armed Forces of the United States	November 7, 1941	5708
3118	8938	Vesting Certain Powers in Warrant Officers of the Army	November 10, 1941	5743
3119	8939	Permitting Certain Positions in the Farm Security Administration to be Filled by Promotion, Transfer, or Assignment of Certain Employees to Acquire a Classified Status	November 13, 1941	5799
3120	8940	Amending Section 2 of Executive Order No. 8833 Dated July 26, 1941, 1941	November 14, 1941	5823
3121	8941	Amending Subdivision IV of Schedule A of the Civil Service Rules	November 17, 1941	5891
3122	8942	Providing for the Administration of the Requisitioning of Property Required for National Defense	November 19, 1941	5910
3123	8943	Amending Executive Order No. 8495 of July 26, 1940, Designating Agencies for the Purpose of Carrying Out the Provisions of Section 40 of the Emergency Relief Act, Fiscal Year 1941, 1941	November 19, 1941	5911
3124	8944	Directing the Federal Works Administration to Take Possession of and Operate a Certain Project of the Grand River Dam Company	November 19, 1941	5947
3125	8945	Exemption of John A. Newlin from Compulsory Retirement for Age	November 22, 1941	−N/P−
3126	8946	Appointment of J.M. Bayles, J.J. Bowe, J.P. Boyce, A.E. Kelly, J.F. Leganey, and C.W. Moore to Classified Positions in Public Buildings Administration	November 22, 1941	−N/P−
3127	8947	Revocation of Executive Order No. 1474 of February 16, 1912, Withdrawing Public Land; Colorado, 1941	November 24, 1941	5987
3128	8948	Exemption of James J. Goutchey from Compulsory Retirement for Age	November 25, 1941	−N/P−
3129	8949	Exemption of Burt W. Andrews from Compulsory Retirement for Age	November 25, 1941	−N/P−
3130	8950	Establishing an Airspace Reservation Over a Portion of the District of Columbia	November 26, 1941	6101
3131	8951	Modification of Executive Order No. 7070 of June 12, 1935, as Amended, Prescribing Regulations Governing Appointments of Employees Paid from Emergency Funds, 1941	November 26, 1941	6101
3132	8952	Revoking Executive Order No. 8458 of June 27, 1940, as Amended by Executive Order No. 8532 of September 4, 1940, and Authorizing Persons Appointed from the Emergency Replacement List Established Pursuant to Such Orders to Acquire a Classified Civil Service Status, 1941, 1941	November 27, 1941	6122
3133	8953	Establishing Los Angeles-Long Beach Harbor Naval Defensive Sea Area; California	November 27, 1941	6122
3134	8954	Withdrawing Public Lands for Use of the War Department; Nevada	November 27, 1941	6123
3135	8955	Extending the Classification Act of 1923, as Amended, to Certain Positions in the War Department and in the Navy Department and Establishing a Salary Differential Therefore	December 1, 1941	6201
3136	8956	Partial Revocation of Executive Order No. 4411 of April 1, 1926, Withdrawing Public Lands for Classification and in Aid of Legislation; Montana, 1941	December 3, 1941	6255
3137	8957	Withdrawing Public Lands for Use of the War Department as Camp Sites; Colorado	December 3, 1941	6255
3138	8958	Exemption of Nicholas W. Dorsey from Compulsory Retirement for Age	December 3, 1941	−N/P−
3139	8959	Designation of Mrs. Ruth W. Talley to Sign Land Patents	December 4, 1941	6265
3140	8960	Amending Executive Order No. 8546 of September 24, 1940, Creating the Defense Communications Board and Defining Its Functions and Duties, 1941	December 6, 1941	6325
3141	8961	Revocation of All Executive Orders or Parts Thereof Establishing Airspace Reservations Within the Continental Limits of the United States, Except the District of Columbia	December 6, 1941	6325
3142	8962	Amending Executive Order No. 7676 of July 26, 1937, Entitled “The Canal Zone Judiciary”, 1941	December 6, 1941	6326
3143	8963	Amendment of Executive Order No. 8389 of April 10, 1940, 1941	December 9, 1941	6348
3144	8964	Prescribing Regulations Governing the Use, Control and Closing of Radio Stations and the Preference or Priority of Communication	December 10, 1941	6367
3145	8965	Extension of Trust Periods on Indian Lands Expiring During Calendar Year 1942	December 10, 1941	6368
3146	8966	Exemption of Bart W. Butler from Compulsory Retirement for Age	December 11, 1941	−N/P−
3147	8967	Exemption of Arthur W. Exline from Compulsory Retirement for Age	December 11, 1941	−N/P−
3148	8968	Exemption of Mrs. Ethel A. Barnes from Compulsory Retirement for Age	December 11, 1941	−N/P−
3149	8969	Exemption of Joshua G. Hefty from Compulsory Retirement for Age	December 11, 1941	−N/P−
3150	8970	Establishing Defensive Sea Areas at Portland, Maine; Portsmouth, New Hampshire; Boston, Massachusetts; Narragansett Bay; San Diego, California; San Francisco, California; Columbia River Entrance; and Strait of Juan de Fuca and Puget Sound	December 11, 1941	6419
3151	8971	Authorizing the Director of Selective Service to Provide for the Physical Rehabilitation of Registrants for Training and Service in the Armed Forces of the United States	December 12, 1941	6419
3152	8972	Authorizing the Secretary of War and the Secretary of the Navy to Establish and Maintain Military Guard and Patrols, and to Take Other Appropriate Measures, to Protect Certain National-Defense Material, Premises, and Utilities from Injury or Destruction	December 12, 1941	6420
3153	8973	Transfer of Employees Possessing Qualifications for National-Defense Work	December 12, 1941	6420
3154	8974	Control of Civil Aviation	December 13, 1941	6441
3155	8975	Authorizing the Attorney General to Make Appointments in the Alien Property Division Without Regard to the Requirements of the Civil Service Act and Rules	December 13, 1941	−N/P−
3156	8976	Authorizing the Secretary of Commerce to Waive Compliance With the Navigation and Vessel Inspection Laws for War Purposes	December 12, 1941	6441
3157	8977	Establishing the National Patent Planning Commission	December 12, 1941	6441
3158	8978	Establishing New York Harbor, New London, Delaware Bay and River, Chesapeake-Norfolk, and Charleston Harbor Defensive Sea Areas and Prescribing Regulations for the Control Thereof	December 16, 1941	6469
3159	8979	Establishing the Kenai National Moose Range; Alaska	December 16, 1941	6471
3160	8980	Amendment of Executive Order No. 9 of January 17, 1873, to Permit Persons Holding State, Territorial, and Municipal Offices to be Appointed as Members of Alien Enemy Hearing Boards, 1941	December 16, 1941	6471
3161	8981	Navy Hospital Area, Coco Solo, Canal Zone	December 17, 1941	6529
3162	8982	Changing the Name of the Economic Defense Board, Established by Executive Order No. 8839 of July 30, 1941, to the Board of Economic Welfare, 1941	December 17, 1941	6530
3163	8983	Appointing a Commission to Investigate the Japanese Attack of December 7, 1941, on Hawaii, 1941	December 18, 1941	6569
3164	8984	Prescribing the Duties of the Commander in Chief of the United States Fleet and the Co-operative Duties of the Chief of Naval Operations	December 18, 1941	6569
3165	8985	Establishing the Office of Censorship and Prescribing Its Functions and Duties	December 19, 1941	6625
3166	8986	Authorizing the Governor of the Panama Canal to Increase the Compensation of Certain Employees	December 19, 1941	6625
3167	8987	Establishing Honolulu Defensive Sea Area	December 20, 1941	6675
3168	8988	Directing That Certain Commissioned Officers of the Public Health Service Shall Constitute a Part of the Naval Forces of the United States	December 23, 1941	6725
3169	8989	Establishing the Office of Defense Transportation in the Executive Office of the President and Defining Its Functions and Duties	December 18, 1941	6725
3170	8990	Appointment of State Employment Security Personnel to Positions in the Social Security Board, Federal Security Agency	December 23, 1941	6727
3171	8991	Coordinating Civil Meteorological Facilities and Services for War Purposes	December 26, 1941	6785
3172	8992	Withdrawing Public Lands for Use of the War Department as a Practice Bombing Range; Washington	December 26, 1941	6785
3173	8993	Exemption of Victor H. Boyden from Compulsory Retirement for Age	December 26, 1941	−N/P−
3174	8994	Exemption of Frank Shoenfield from Compulsory Retirement for Age	December 26, 1941	−N/P−
3175	8995	Exemption of Roberta L. Lindsey from Compulsory Retirement for Age	December 26, 1941	−N/P−
3176	8996	Exemption of Alvin M. Rankin from Compulsory Retirement for Age	December 26, 1941	−N/P−
3177	8997	Exemption of Certain Employees in the Field Service of the Post Office Department from Compulsory Retirement for Age	December 26, 1941	−N/P−
3178	8998	Amendment of Executive Order No. 8389 of April 10, 1940, as Amended, 1941	December 26, 1941	6785
3179	8999	Withdrawing Public Land for Use of the War Department for Military Purposes; Oregon	December 26, 1941	6786
3180	9000	Withdrawing Public Land for Use of the War Department for Military Purposes; Oregon	December 26, 1941	6787
3181	9001	Authorizing the War Department, the Navy Department, and the United States Maritime Commission to Perform the Functions and Exercise the Powers Described in Title II of an Act Approved December 18, 1941, Entitled “An Act to Expedite the Prosecution of the War Effort”, and Prescribing Regulations for the Exercise of Such Functions and Powers, 1941	December 27, 1941	6787
3182	9001-A	Authorizing and Directing the United States Maritime Commission to Resell the S.S. “Normandie” to the Former Owners Thereof	December 27, 1941	801
3183	9002	Exemption of Frank Burke from Compulsory Retirement for Age	December 29, 1941	−N/P−
3184	9003	Exemption of Joseph Tombrink from Compulsory Retirement for Age	December 30, 1941	−N/P−
3185	9004	Amending Schedules A and B of the Civil Service Rules	December 30, 1941	2
3186	9005	Permitting Certain Positions to be Filled by Promotion, Transfer, or Assignment of Certain Employees and Authorizing Such Employees to Acquire a Classified Status	December 30, 1941	10

=== 1942 ===
Relative No.	Absolute No.	Title / Description	Date signed
3187	9006	Certifying the Territory of Hawaii as a Distressed Emergency Area	1942-01-02
3188	9007	Transfer of Certain Officers From the U.S. Coast and Geodetic Survey to the Navy Department	1942-01-02
3189	9008	Amending Executive Order No. 8990 of December 23, 1941, Relating to Appointment of State Employment Security Personnel to Positions in the Social Security Board	1942-01-02
3190	9009	Exemption of Maurice A. Emerson From Compulsory Retirement for Age	1942-01-03
3191	9010	Exemption of John W. Mays From Compulsory Retirement for Age	1942-01-03
3192	9011	Prescribing Regulations Governing the Manner of Expending and Accounting for Funds Appropriated for the Army of the Philippines	1942-01-03
3193	9012	Possession Relinquished of Plant of Federal Shipbuilding & Dry Dock Company	1942-01-05
3194	9013	Walter M. Brucher Permitted To Compete in Examination for Postmaster	1942-01-06
3195	9014	Withdrawing Public Land for Use of the War Department; Washington	1942-01-06
3196	9015	Exemption of Charles Gregg From Compulsory Retirement for Age	1942-01-12
3197	9016	Exemption of Henry L. Schmidt From Compulsory Retirement for Age	1942-01-12
3198	9017	Establishment of the National War Labor Board	1942-01-12
3199	9018	Suspension of the Provisions of the Act of March 3, 1931, as to the War and Navy Departments and the Coast Guard	1942-01-12
3200	9019	Revoking in Part and Modifying Executive Order No. 8578 of October 29, 1940, and Reserving Public Land for Use of the War Department as an Aerial Machine-Gun Range; Nevada	1942-01-12
3201	9020	Transferring Control of the Airport Near Tonopah, Nevada, to War Department	1942-01-12
3202	9021	Modifying Certain Executive Orders To Permit the Leasing of Certain Lands for Airport Purposes; Wyoming	1942-01-12
3203	9022	Partial Revocation of Executive Order No. 6957 of February 4, 1935, Withdrawing Certain Public Lands; Alaska	1942-01-13
3204	9023	Extension of the Provisions of Executive Order No. 9001 of December 27, 1941, to Contracts of the Treasury Department, the Department of Agriculture, the Federal Works Agency, the Panama Canal, the Government Printing Office, and the National Advisory Committee for Aeronautics	1942-01-14
3205	9024	Establishing the War Production Board in the Executive Office of the President and Defining its Functions and Duties	1942-01-16
3206	9025	Appointment of George Howe to a Position in Public Buildings Administration Without Regard to Civil Service Rules	1942-01-16
3207	9026	Withdrawing Public Lands for Use of the War Department as a Cantonment Site; Alaska	1942-01-16
3208	9027	Amending Subdivision XL of Schedule A of the Civil Service Rules	1942-01-16
3209	9028	Withdrawal of Public Lands for Lookout Station for Use in Cooperative Forest Protection; California	1942-01-20
3210	9029	Withdrawing Public Lands for Use of the War Department as a General Bombing Range; New Mexico	1942-01-20
3211	9030	Exemption of Walter C. Mendenhall From Compulsory Retirement for Age	1942-01-20
3212	9031	Exemption of Edgar M. Cohee From Compulsory Retirement for Age	1942-01-20
3213	9032	Exemption of Lawrence V. Bateman From Compulsory Retirement for Age	1942-01-20
3214	9033	Exemption of Abraham Strauss From Compulsory Retirement for Age	1942-01-21
3215	9034	Exemption of Thomas A. Haigh From Compulsory Retirement for Age	1942-01-21
3216	9035	Withdrawal of Public Land for Use as an Administrative Site in Connection With the Palmer-Richardson Highway; Alaska	1942-01-21
3217	9036	Reserving a Tract of Land for Use by the Department of Commerce as a Beacon Site; Washington	1942-01-22
3218	9037	Exemption of Clarence E. Ingling From Compulsory Retirement for Age	1942-01-23
3219	9038	Amending Executive Order No. 9017 of January 12, 1942, To Provide for the Appointment of Associate Members of the National War Labor Board	1942-01-24
3220	9039	Authorizing Sick and Rest Leave for Alien Employees of the Panama Canal and the Panama Railroad Company	1942-01-24
3221	9040	Defining Additional Functions and Duties of the War Production Board	1942-01-24
3222	9041	Prescribing Regulations Governing the Grades and Ratings of Enlisted Men of the Army of the United States	1942-01-26
3223	9042	Withdrawing Public Lands for Use of the War Department for Aviation Purposes; Oregon	1942-01-26
3224	9043	Exemption of Edward F. Ruggles From Compulsory Retirement for Age	1942-01-27
3225	9044	Exemption of William A. Holt From Compulsory Retirement for Age	1942-01-28
3226	9045	Exemption of Richard J. Barrett From Compulsory Retirement for Age	1942-01-28
3227	9046	Amending Executive Order No. 8771 of June 6, 1941, Entitled "Authorizing the United States Maritime Commission To Take Over Certain Foreign Merchant Vessels"	1942-01-28
3228	9047	Exempting Certain Officers and Employees in the Executive Branch of the Government From Automatic Separation From the Service	1942-01-30
3229	9048	Suspending the Limitations Upon Punishments for Violations of Articles of War 58, 59 and 86	1942-02-03
3230	9049	Ordering Certain Organizations and Units of the Organized Reserves Into the Active Military Service of the United States	1942-02-06
3231	9050	Authorizing and Directing the Secretary of the Navy To Issue Citations in the Name of the President to Naval and Marine Corps Units for Outstanding Performance in Action	1942-02-06
3232	9051	Amending Executive Order No. 8099 of April 28, 1939, as Amended, Relating to Administration of Benefits Provided by Act of Congress Approved April 3, 1939	1942-02-06
3233	9052	Amending Subdivision VIII of Schedule A of the Civil Service Rules	1942-02-06
3234	9053	Withdrawing Public Lands for Use of the War Department as a Chemical Warfare Range; Utah	1942-02-06
3235	9054	Establishing a War Shipping Administration in the Executive Office of the President and Defining Its Functions and Duties	1942-02-07
3236	9055	Extension of the Provisions of Executive Order No. 9001 of December 27, 1941, to Contracts of the Interior Department	1942-02-10
3237	9056	Exemption of August G. Ahfont From Compulsory Retirement for Age	1942-02-10
3238	9057	Amending Regulations Concerning Foreign Service Pay Adjustment	1942-02-11
3239	9058	Extension of the Provisions of Executive Order No. 9001 of December 27, 1941, to Contracts of the Tennessee Valley Authority	1942-02-12
3240	9059	Excluding Certain Tracts of Land From the Chugach and Tongass National Forests and Restoring Them to Entry; Alaska	1942-02-12
3241	9060	Including Certain Lands in the Fremont National Forest; Oregon	1942-02-12
3242	9061	Placing Certain Lands Within the Fremont National Forest Under the Administration of the Department of the Interior; Oregon	1942-02-12
3243	9062	Exemption of Michael Conley From Compulsory Retirement for Age	1942-02-16
3244	9063	Authorizing the Civil Service Commission To Adopt Special Procedures Relating to Recruitment, Placement, and Changes in Status of Personnel for the Federal Service	1942-02-16
3245	9064	Authorizing the Governor of the Panama Canal To Furnish Certain Transportation to Persons Engaged for Service on the Isthmus of Panama	1942-02-16
3246	9065	Amendment of Section 11 of the Regulations Governing Highways, Vehicles, and Vehicular Traffic in the Canal Zone	1942-02-17
3247	9066	Established areas in the U.S. from which any or all persons may be excluded - Japanese-American internment	1942-02-19
3248	9067	Providing for the Transfer of Personnel to War Agencies	1942-02-20
3249	9068	Partial Revocation of Executive Order No. 6795 of July 26, 1934, Withdrawing Public Lands; Wyoming	1942-02-20
3250	9069	Consolidating Certain Agencies Within the Department of Agriculture	1942-02-23
3251	9070	Consolidating the Housing Agencies and Functions of the Government Into the National Housing Agency	1942-02-24
3252	9071	Transferring Functions of the Federal Loan Agency to the Department of Commerce	1942-02-24
3253	9072	Transfer of the Pioneer (ex Argus), Guide (ex Andradite) and Pratt (ex YP-96) and certain personnel from the Coast and Geodetic Survey to the War and Navy Departments	1942-02-24
3254	9073	Extending the Limits of the Customs Port of Entry of Detroit, Michigan, in Customs Collection District Number 38 (Michigan)	1942-02-25
3255	9074	Directing the Secretary of the Navy To Take Action Necessary To Protect Vessels, Harbors, Ports, and Waterfront Facilities	1942-02-25
3256	9075	Authorizing and Directing the Secretary of War To Issue Citations in the Name of the President of the United States to Army Units for Outstanding Performance in Action	1942-02-26
3257	9076	Authorizing Inspection by the Office of Price Administration of Corporation Statistical Transcript Cards Prepared From Income and Declared-Value Excess-Profits Tax Returns	1942-02-26
3258	9077	Exemption of Gustave R. A. Elmgren From Compulsory Retirement for Age	1942-02-26
3259	9078	Establishing the Army Specialist Corps	1942-02-26
3260	9079	Making Certain Public Health Service Hospitals Available for the Care and Treatment of Insane Persons	1942-02-26
3261	9080	Joint Mexican-United States Defense Commission	1942-02-27
3262	9081	Withdrawing Public Lands for Use of the War Department for Aviation Purposes; Arizona	1942-02-27
3263	9082	Reorganization of the Army of the United States and Transfer of Functions Within the War Department	1942-02-28
3264	9083	Redistribution of Maritime Functions	1942-02-28
3265	9084	Amending Executive Order No. 8512 of August 13, 1940, Prescribing Regulations Pertaining to Budgetary Administration and Financial Reporting	1942-03-03
3266	9085	Withdrawal of Public Land for Use as an Administrative Site by the Alaskan Fire Control Service; Alaska	1942-03-04
3267	9086	Withdrawing Public Lands for Use of the War Department as a General Bombing Range; Nevada	1942-03-04
3268	9087	Transfer of Jurisdiction Over Certain Lands Containing Oil and Gas Deposits From the War Department to the Department of the Interior	1942-03-05
3269	9088	Prescribing Regulations Concerning Civilian Defense	1942-03-06
3270	9089	Prescribing Regulations Governing the Use, Control, and Closing of Stations and Facilities for Wire Communications	1942-03-06
3271	9090	Establishing an Airspace Reservation Over Portions of Ulster and Dutchess Counties, New York	1942-03-06
3272	9091	Establishing the Beltrami Wildlife Management Area; Minnesota	1942-03-06
3273	9092	Designating the Honorable A. Cecil Snyder as Acting Judge of the District Court of the United States for Puerto Rico	1942-03-06
3274	9093	Certifying the Island of Puerto Rico as a Distressed Emergency Area	1942-03-10
3275	9094	Abolishing the Board of Surveys and Maps and Authorizing the Director of the Bureau of the Budget To Perform Its Functions	1942-03-10
3276	9095	Establishing the Office of Alien Property Custodian and Defining Its Functions and Duties	1942-03-11
3277	9096	Reorganization of the Navy Department and the Naval Service Affecting the Office of the Chief of Naval Operations and the Commander in Chief, United States Fleet	1942-03-12
3278	9097	Power Site Restoration No. 496. Partial Revocation of Executive Order of March 27, 1913, Creating Power Site Reserve No. 348, and of Executive Order of December 20, 1916, Creating Power Site Reserve No. 563; Wyoming	1942-03-13
3279	9098	Modification of Executive Order No. 8507 of August 8, 1940, Withdrawing Public Lands for Use of the War Department as an Anti-Aircraft Firing Range	1942-03-14
3280	9099	Excluding Certain Lands From the Manistee National Forest; Michigan	1942-03-14
3281	9100	Exemption of August Thomas From Compulsory Retirement for Age	1942-03-16
3282	9101	Withdrawing Public Lands in Aid of Legislation; California	1942-03-16
3283	9102	Establishing the War Relocation Authority in the Executive Office of the President and Defining Its Functions and Duties	1942-03-18
3284	9103	Providing Uniform Control Over the Publication and Use of Federal Statistical Information Which Would Give Aid and Comfort to the Enemy	1942-03-18
3285	9104	Withdrawing Public Lands for Use of the War Department as an Aerial Gunnery Range; Arizona	1942-03-18
3286	9105	Amendment of Executive Order No. 8704 of March 4, 1941, Prescribing Regulations Governing the Granting of Allowances for Quarters and Subsistence to Enlisted Men	1942-03-20
3287	9106	Excepting Certain Persons From the Classification of "Alien Enemy" for the Purpose of Permitting Them To Apply for Naturalization	1942-03-20
3288	9107	Withdrawing Public Lands for Use of the War Department for Military Purposes; California	1942-03-20
3289	9108	Directing the Director of the Office of Defense Transportation To Take Control of the Toledo, Peoria, and Western Railroad Company	1942-03-21
3290	9109	Revoking in Part Executive Order No. 6583 of February 3, 1934, and Withdrawing Public Lands for Use of the War Department for Military Purposes; New Mexico	1942-03-21
3291	9110	Enlarging the Fort Gulick Military Reservation; Canal Zone	1942-03-24
3292	9111	Amendment of Section 3 of Executive Order No. 8802 of June 25, 1941, Establishing the Committee on Fair Employment Practice	1942-03-25
3293	9112	Authorizing Financing Contracts To Facilitate the Prosecution of the War	1942-03-26
3294	9113	Transfer of the Oceanographer and the Hydrographer and Certain Personnel From the Coast and Geodetic Survey to the War and Navy Departments	1942-03-28
3295	9114	Withdrawing Public Lands for Use of the War Department for Military Purposes; Alaska	1942-03-28
3296	9115	Withdrawing Public Lands for the Use of the Department of State; New Mexico	1942-03-28
3297	9116	Extension of the Provisions of Executive Order No. 9001 of December 27, 1941, to Contracts of the Office of the Coordinator of Inter-American Affairs, the Civil Aeronautics Administration, the National Housing Agency, the Veterans' Administration, and the Federal Communications Commission	1942-03-30
3298	9117	Prescribing Regulations Governing Overtime Compensation of Certain Employees of the National Advisory Committee for Aeronautics	1942-03-31
3299	9118	Exemption of Harry L. Mickey From Compulsory Retirement for Age	1942-04-01
3300	9119	Enlarging the St. Marks National Wildlife Refuge; Florida	1942-04-01
3301	9120	Revocation of Executive Order No. 1023, Reserving Land for the Use of the Department of Agriculture; Alaska	1942-04-01
3302	9121	Transfer of Jurisdiction Over Certain Lands From the Secretary of Agriculture to the Secretary of War; Illinois	1942-04-01
3303	9122	To Amend the Provisions of Executive Order No. 8588 Entitled "Prescribing Regulations Governing the Payment of Expenses of Transportation of Household Goods and Personal Effects of Certain Civilian Officers and Employees of the United States"	1942-04-06
3304	9123	Authorizing the Procurement Division To Use Quartz Crystals Acquired Pursuant to the Act of June 7, 1939	1942-04-07
3305	9124	Transfer of Lands From the Cache National Forest to the Caribou National Forest; Idaho and Utah	1942-04-07
3306	9125	Defining Additional Functions, Duties and Powers of the War Production Board and the Office of Price Administration	1942-04-07
3307	9126	Transferring Cognizance of the Duties and Functions of the Hydrographic Office and the Naval Observatory From the Bureau of Navigation, Navy Department, to the Chief of Naval Operations	1942-04-08
3308	9127	Designating the Departments and Agencies To Inspect the Plants and Audit the Books and Records of Defense Contractors Under Title XIII of the Second War Powers Act, 1942	1942-04-10
3309	9128	Defining Additional Functions and Duties of the Board of Economic Warfare	1942-04-13
3310	9129	Authorizing the United States Maritime Commission To Acquire and Dispose of Property	1942-04-13
3311	9130	Reserving Certain Public Lands in Connection With the Randolph County State Game Refuge; Arkansas	1942-04-13
3312	9131	Exemption of Leo A. McIntire From Compulsory Retirement for Age	1942-04-13
3313	9132	Withdrawing Public Lands for Use of the War Department in Connection With the Fort Peck Dam and Reservoir Project; Montana	1942-04-13
3314	9132-A	Assignment of Frequencies to Government Radio Stations (Confidential)	1942-04-13
3315	9133	Transferring Certain Motor Repair Shops With Their Personnel and Property and the Functions of Operations and Maintenance Thereof From the Civilian Conservation Corps to the War Department	1942-04-14
3316	9134	Amendment of Executive Order No. 8757 of May 20, 1941 Establishing the Office of Civilian Defense	1942-04-15
3317	9135	Establishing the Interdepartmental Committee for the Voluntary Pay Roll Savings Plan for the Purchase of War Savings Bonds	1942-04-16
3318	9136	Modifying Executive Orders No. 1919 1/2 of April 21, 1914, No. 2728 of October 8, 1917, and No. 3672 of May 8, 1922, and Reserving Public Lands for the Use of the War Department; Alaska	1942-04-16
3319	9137	Withdrawing Public Lands for Use of the War Department for Flood Control Purposes; Arkansas	1942-04-16
3320	9138	Providing Further for the Administration of the Requisitioning of Property Required for the Prosecution of the War	1942-04-17
3321	9139	Establishing the War Manpower Commission in the Executive Office of the President and Transferring and Coordinating Certain Functions To Facilitate the Mobilization and Utilization of Manpower	1942-04-18
3322	9140	Establishing the Safford National Wildlife Refuge; Arizona	1942-04-20
3323	9141	Possession and Operation of Plans of Brewster Aeronautical Corporation	1942-04-18
3324	9142	Transferring Certain Functions, Property, and Personnel From the Department of Justice to the Alien Property Custodian	1942-04-21
3325	9143	Withdrawing Public Lands for Use of the War Department for Holding, Reconsignment, and Quartermaster Depots; California	1942-04-21
3326	9144	Exemption of Herbert H. Evans From Compulsory Retirement for Age	1942-04-24
3327	9145	Reserving Public Lands for the Use of the Public Road Commission in Connection With the Construction, Operation and Maintenance of the Palmer-Richardson Highway; Alaska	1942-04-23
3328	9146	Authorizing the Secretary of the Interior To Withdraw and Reserve Public Lands	1942-04-24
3329	9147	Revocation of Executive Order No. 2987 of November 4, 1918, Placing Certain Land and Water Areas Under the Jurisdiction of the Secretary of Navy for Use as a Naval Air Station	1942-04-25
3330	9148	Transferring Credit Union Functions, Records, Property, and Personnel From the Farm Credit Administration to the Federal Deposit Insurance Corporation	1942-04-27
3331	9149	Amendment of Executive Order 5643 of June 8, 1931, Prescribing Regulations Governing Representation and Post Allowances	1942-04-27
3332	9150	Authorizing the Federal Public Housing Commissioner, National Housing Agency, To Acquire and Dispose of Property	1942-04-28
3333	9151	Transfer of Certain Public Land From Public Buildings Administration, Federal Works Agency, to the War Department; Florida	1942-04-28
3334	9152	Directions and Regulations Concerning Census Reports	1942-04-29
3335	9153	Amending Executive Order No. 8950 of November 26, 1941, Establishing an Airspace Reservation Over a Portion of the District of Columbia	1942-04-30
3336	9153-A	Withdrawing Public Lands for Use of the War Department for Military Purposes (Unalaska - Dutch Harbor)	1942-04-30
3337	9154	Authorizing Certain Exclusions From the Operation of the Civil Service Retirement Act of May 29, 1930, as Amended	1942-05-01
3338	9155	Approving Regulations of the Civil Service Commission Relating to Efficiency-Rating Boards of Review	1942-05-01
3339	9156	Further Defining the Functions and Duties of the Office of Defense Transportation	1942-05-02
3340	9157	Regulations With Respect to the Making Available of Records, Schedules, Reports, Returns and Other Information by the Secretary of Commerce, and With Respect to the Use Thereof After the Same Have Been Made Available	1942-05-09
3341	9158	Air Medal	1942-05-11
3342	9159	Amendment of Executive Order No. 7126, on Submission of Certain Estimates to the Bureau of the Budget	1942-05-11
3343	9160	Amendment of Executive Order No. 8910 of September 27, 1941, Transferring Jurisdiction Over Certain Lands From the Secretary of Agriculture to the Secretary of the Navy; Indiana	1942-05-11
3344	9161	Revoking Executive Order No. 8975 of December 13, 1941	1942-05-13
3345	9162	Designating the Ports of Guayanilla, Puerto Rico, and Jobos, Puerto Rico, as Customs Ports of Entry in Customs Collection District No. 49 (Puerto Rico)	1942-05-13
3346	9163	Establishing a Women's Army Auxiliary Corps and Providing for Its Organization Into Units	1942-05-15
3347	9164	Amending Section 1 of Executive Order No. 8986 of December 19, 1941, Authorizing the Governor of the Panama Canal To Increase the Compensation of Certain Employees	1942-05-18
3348	9165	Providing for the Protection of Essential Facilities From Sabotage and Other Destructive Acts	1942-05-19
3349	9166	Establishing the Lamesteer National Wildlife Refuge; Montana	1942-05-19
3350	9167	Establishing the Halfbreed Lake National Wildlife Refuge; Montana	1942-05-19
3351	9168	Establishing Matagorda Bay Defensive Sea Area	1942-05-20
3352	9169	Possession Relinquished of Plants of Brewster Aeronautical Corporation	1942-05-20
3353	9170	Making Certain Navigation Laws of the United States Applicable to the Virgin Islands	1942-05-21
3354	9171	Enlarging the Naval Radio Station, Summit, Canal Zone	1942-05-21
3355	9172	Establishing a Panel for the Creation of Emergency Boards for the Adjustment of Railway Labor Disputes	1942-05-22
3356	9173	Transferring the Control and Jurisdiction Over Certain Property Located at Juneau, Alaska, From the Department of the Interior to the Navy Department; Alaska	1942-05-23
3357	9174	Exemption of Harry P. Hoby from Compulsory Retirement for Age	1942-05-28
3358	9175	Amendment of Section 23 of the Regulations Governing Highways, Vehicles, and Vehicular Traffic in the Canal Zone	1942-05-28
3359	9176	Transferring the Administration of the Act of June 8, 1938, as Amended, Requiring the Registration of Agents of Foreign Principals, From the Secretary of State to the Attorney General	1942-05-29
3360	9177	Defining Additional Functions, Duties and Powers of the Secretary of War, the Secretary of the Treasury, the Secretary of Agriculture, and the Reconstruction Finance Corporation	1942-05-30
3361	9178	Authorizing the Secretary of the Interior To Acquire and Dispose of Property Deemed Necessary in Connection With the Helium Development and Production Program of the Department of the Interior	1942-05-30
3362	9179	Authorizing the Commissioner of Public Roads, Federal Works Agency, To Acquire and Dispose of Property	1942-06-05
3363	9180	Authorizing the Secretary of the Interior To Enter Into Contracts for the Disposal of Yucca Growing on the Public Domain	1942-06-05
3364	9181	Administration of the Federal Government Services in Alaska	1942-06-11
3365	9182	Consolidating Certain War Information Functions Into an Office of War Information	1942-06-13
3366	9183	Changing the Name of the Defense Communications Board to Board of War Communications	1942-06-15
3367	9184	Amending Executive Order No. 9139 of April 18, 1942, To Provide for the Appointment of Additional Members to the War Manpower Commission	1942-06-22
3368	9185	Establishing the Susquehanna National Wildlife Refuge; Maryland	1942-06-23
3369	9186	Authorizing the Federal Works Administration To Acquire and Dispose of Property	1942-06-27
3370	9187	Transfer of Certain Personnel From the Coast and Geodetic Survey to the War and Navy Departments	1942-06-30
3371	9188	Suspending Certain Statutory Provisions Relating to Employment in the Canal Zone	1942-06-30
3372	9189	Suspending Certain Statutory Provisions Relating to Employment in the Canal Zone	1942-07-02
3373	9190	Amending Executive Order No. 8197 of July 11, 1939, Prescribing Regulations Pertaining to the Administration of the Act of May 3, 1939	1942-07-02
3374	9191	Amending the Foreign Service Regulations of the United States	1942-07-03
3375	9192	Amending Executive Order No. 9140 of April 20, 1942, Establishing the Safford National Wildlife Refuge; Arizona	1942-07-03
3376	9193	Amending Executive Order No. 9095 Establishing the Office of Alien Property Custodian and Defining the Functions and Duties and Related Matters	1942-07-06
3377	9194	Transferring Duties and Functions with Respect to Acquisition and Disposition of Real Estate from the Office of the Judge Advocate General of the Navy to the Chief of the Bureau of Yards and Docks	1942-07-07
3378	9195	Regulations Relating to Aerial Flights by Personnel of the Army, Navy, Marine Corps, Coast Guard, and National Guard	1942-07-07
3379	9196	Government Purchases of Prison-Made Goods	1942-07-09
3380	9197	Transferring Certain Lands from the Secretary of Agriculture to the Secretary of War for Military Purposes - South Dakota	1942-07-09
3381	9198	Transfer of Merchant Marine Training Functions	1942-07-11
3382	9199	Exemption of Dr. Howard K. Tuttle From Compulsory Retirement for Age	1942-07-16
3383	9200	Amending Subdivision II of Schedule A of the Civil Service Rules	1942-07-16
3384	9201	Exemption of Morris B. Hostetter From Compulsory Retirement for Age	1942-07-17
3385	9202	Exemption of Oscar L. Moritz From Compulsory Retirement for Age	1942-07-17
3386	9203	Authorizing the Procurement Division To Use Manila Fiber Acquired Pursuant to Act of June 7, 1939	1942-07-20
3387	9204	Coordination of Federal Activities Affecting the Fishery Industry	1942-07-21
3388	9205	Establishing the President's War Relief Control Board and Defining its Functions and Duties	1942-07-25
3389	9206	Prescribing Regulations Governing the Granting of Allowances for Quarters and Subsistence to Enlisted Men	1942-07-27
3390	9207	Extending the Limits of the Customs Port of Entry of Salem, Massachusetts, in Customs Collection District Number 4 (Massachusetts)	1942-07-29
3391	9208	Exemption of John F. Phillips From Compulsory Retirement for Age	1942-08-01
3392	9209	Regulations Governing the Payment of Additional Compensation to Enlisted Men of the Marine Corps Specially Qualified in the Use of Arms	1942-08-01
3393	9210	Regulations Governing the Payment of Additional Compensation to Enlisted Men of the Navy and Coast Guard Specially Qualified in the Use of Arms	1942-08-01
3394	9211	Authorizing the Division of Central Administrative Services in the Office for Emergency Management, Executive Office of the President, To Acquire and Dispose of Property	1942-08-01
3395	9212	Transportation to the United States of Certain Employees Terminating Service With the Panama Canal or the Panama Railroad Company on the Isthmus of Panama	1942-08-01
3396	9213	Extending the Existence of the Quetico-Superior Committee	1942-08-04
3397	9214	Extending the Authority of the Office of Defense Transportation to Domestic Transportation Within the Territories and Possessions of the United States	1942-08-05
3398	9215	Authorizing the Secretary of War To Assume Full Control of Certain Airports	1942-08-06
3399	9216	Authorizing the Adjutant General To Execute Certificates of Facts or Events Officially Recorded When it is Contrary to Public Policy to Divulge the Source of Official Knowledge or the Text of the Official Record	1942-08-07
3400	9217	Authorizing the Reconstruction Finance Corporation To Acquire and Dispose of Property Deemed Necessary for Military, Naval, or Other War Purposes	1942-08-07
3401	9218	Authorizing the Office of Scientific Research and Development in the Office for Emergency Management To Acquire and Dispose of Property	1942-08-11
3402	9219	Extension of Provisions of Executive Order No. 9001 of December 27, 1941, to the Office of Scientific Research and Development in the Office for Emergency Management	1942-08-11
3403	9220	Authorizing the Secretary of the Navy To Take Possession and Operate the Plant of the General Cable Company at Bayonne, New Jersey	1942-08-13
3404	9221	Extension of the Provisions of Executive Order No. 9001 of December 27, 1941, to Contracts of Federal Prison Industries, Inc.	1942-08-15
3405	9222	Authorizing the Payment of Monetary Allowances in Lieu of Transportation in Kind for Dependents of Officers, Warrant Officers, and Enlisted Men Above the Fourth Grade of the Army, Navy, Marine Corps, Coast Guard, Coast and Geodetic Survey, and the Public Health Service Upon Permanent Change of Station	1942-08-15
3406	9223	Changing Effective Date of a Provision of Regulations Governing Payment of Expenses of Transportation of Household Goods and Personal Effects of Certain Civilian Officers and Employees of the United States	1942-08-15
3407	9224	Transferring Jurisdiction Over Certain Lands From the Secretary of Agriculture to the Secretary of War for Military Purposes	1942-08-15
3408	9225	Authorizing the Secretary of War To Take Possession of and Operate the Plant of the S.A. Woods Machine Company at South Boston, Massachusetts	1942-08-19
3409	9226	Regulations Governing the Furnishing of Clothing in Kind or Payment of Cash Allowances in Lieu Thereof to Enlisted Men of the Navy, the Coast Guard, the Naval Reserve, and the Coast Guard Reserve	1942-08-19
3410	9227	Amendment of Executive Order No. 4314 of September 25, 1925, Establishing Rules Governing the Navigation of the Panama Canal and Adjacent Waters	1942-08-19
3411	9228	Amendment of Executive Order No. 4314 of September 25, 1925, Establishing Rules Governing the Navigation of the Panama Canal and Adjacent Waters	1942-08-19
3412	9229	Possession Relinquished of Bayonne Plant of General Cable Corporation	1942-08-20
3413	9230	Amending Section 3 of Executive Order No. 8743 of April 23, 1941, Extending the Classified Civil Service	1942-08-20
3414	9231	Suspension of Eight-Hour Law as to Mechanics and Laborers Employed by the Department of the Interior or the Federal Works Agency in Construction and Reconditioning of Highways Necessary for the National Defense in the Territory of Alaska	1942-08-20
3415	9232	Transferring the Functions of the Sample Surveys Section of the Work Projects Administration to the Bureau of the Census	1942-08-20
3416	9233	Extension of the Provisions of Executive Order 9001 of December 27, 1941, to the Board of Economic Warfare	1942-08-22
3417	9234	Establishing Ten Wildlife Management Areas	1942-08-31
3418	9235	Providing for the Effective Utilization of Supplies and Equipment by Government Agencies	1942-08-31
3419	9236	Transfer of the Survey Ship Pathfinder to the Navy Department and Transfer of Certain Personnel Among the Coast and Geodetic and the War and Navy Departments	1942-09-03
3420	9237	Authorizing the Appointment of Certain Employees in the Postal Service Without Regard to the Civil Service Rules	1942-09-03
3421	9238	Exemption of Rudolph Forster and Maurice C. Latta from Compulsory Retirement for Age	1942-09-03
3422	9239	Amending Subdivision XI of Schedule A and Revoking Paragraph 2 of Subdivision III of Schedule B of the Civil Service Rules	1942-08-08
3423	9240	Regulations Relating to Overtime Wage Compensation	1942-09-09
3424	9241	Extension of the Provisions of Executive Order No. 9001 of December 27, 1941, to the Office of Strategic Services, United States Joint Chiefs of Staff	1942-09-01
3425	9242	Authorizing the Procurement Division To Use Optical Glass Acquired Pursuant to the Act of June 7, 1939	1942-09-11
3426	9242-A	Amending Executive Order No. 9158 of May 11, 1942, To Provide That the Air Medal May Be Awarded to Persons Serving With the Army, Navy, Marine Corps, or Coast Guard of the United States	1942-09-11
3427	9243	Providing for the Transfer and Release of Federal Personnel	1942-09-12
3428	9244	Amending Executive Order No. 9054 Entitled Establishing a War Shipping Administration in the Executive Office of the President and Defining its Functions and Duties	1942-09-16
3429	9245	Transferring to the Secretary of Interior the Functions of the United States High Commissioner to the Philippine Islands	1942-09-16
3430	9246	Providing for the Coordination and Control of the Rubber Program	1942-09-17
3431	9247	Transferring Certain Employment Service and Training Functions to the War Manpower Commission	1942-09-17
3432	9248	Amending Executive Order No. 9240 Entitled Regulations Relating to Overtime Wage Compensation	1942-09-17
3433	9249	Authorizing the Secretary of Agriculture To Acquire and Dispose of Property	1942-10-01
3434	9250	Providing for the Stabilizing of the National Economy	1942-10-03
3435	9251	Suspension of Eight-Hour Law as to Laborers and Mechanics Employed by the Civil Aeronautics Administration in the Construction of Public Works Which are Necessary for the Successful Prosecution of the War	1942-10-03
3436	9252	Approving Regulations of the Civil Service Commission Relating to Efficiency-Rating Boards of Review	1942-10-09
3437	9253	Extension of the Provisions of Executive Order No. 9001 of December 27, 1941, to Contracts of the Immigration and Naturalization Service, Department of Justice	1942-10-09
3438	9254	Possession and Operations of Plants of Triumph Explosives, Inc. and Affiliates	1942-10-12
3439	9255	Prescribing Regulations Governing the Payment of Rental Allowances to Officers	1942-10-13
3440	9256	Termination and Liquidation of the Electric Home and Farm Authority	1942-10-13
3441	9257	Enlarging Naval Petroleum Reserve No. 1	1942-10-15
3442	9258	Inspection by the Office of Price Administration of Corporation Statistical Transcript Cards Prepared From Income and Declared Value Excess-Profits Tax Returns	1942-10-26
3443	9259	Authorizing the Civil Service Commission To Confer a Classified Civil-Service Status on Certain Government Employees	1942-10-26
3444	9260	Legion of Merit	1942-10-29
3445	9261	Amending Regulations Concerning Foreign Service Pay Adjustment	1942-10-31
3446	9262	Authorizing the Secretary of Navy To Perform and Exercise Certain Additional Functions, Duties, and Powers	1942-11-05
3447	9263	Revoking the Designations of Cordova, Alaska, and Mahukona, Hawaii, as Customs Ports of Entry	1942-11-05
3448	9264	Extension of the Provisions of Executive Order No. 9001 of December 27, 1941, to Contracts of the Department of Commerce	1942-11-05
3449	9265	American, European-African-Middle Eastern and Asiatic-Pacific Campaign Medals	1942-11-06
3450	9266	Establishing Buzzards Bay and Vineyard Sound Defensive Sea Area	1942-11-06
3451	9267	Suspending Until Further Order the Maximum Limitations of Punishment for Violation of Article of War 61	1942-11-09
3452	9268	Suspending in Part the Provisions of Section 12 of the Naval Aviation Cadet Act of 1942	1942-11-09
3453	9269	Modifying the Limitation on Fixed Fees With Respect to Contracts of the Treasury Department for Architectural and Engineering Services	1942-11-11
3454	9270	Correcting Executive Order No. 9257 of October 15, 1942, Enlarging Naval Petroleum Reserve No. 1	1942-11-13
3455	9271	Exemption from Compulsory Retirement for Age of George T. Summerlin	1942-11-17
3456	9272	Extension of Trust Periods on Indian Lands Expiring During Calendar Year 1943	1942-11-17
3457	9273	Amendment of Executive Order No. 8910 of September 27, 1941, and Executive Order No. 9160 of May 11, 1941, Transferring Jurisdiction Over Certain Lands From the Secretary of Agriculture to the Secretary of the Navy	1942-11-18
3458	9274	Authorizing an Increase in the Number of Units and Members of the Women's Army Auxiliary Corps	1942-11-19
3459	9275	Prescribing Additional Regulations Governing Persons and Vessels in Defensive Sea Areas	1942-11-23
3460	9276	Establishing the Petroleum Administration for War and Defining its Functions and Duties	1942-12-02
3461	9277	Award of the Purple Heart to Persons Serving with Navy, Marine Corps, or Coast Guard of the United States	1942-12-03
3462	9278	Appointment of Benjamin W. Thoron, Director, Division of Territories and Island Possessions, Department of the Interior, as the Administrator of the Puerto Rico Reconstruction Administration	1942-12-04
3463	9279	Providing for the Most Effective Mobilization and Utilization of the National Manpower and Transferring the Selective Service System to the War Manpower Commission	1942-12-05
3464	9280	Delegating Authority With Respect to the Nation's Food Program	1942-12-05
3465	9281	Inspection of Income, Excess-Profits, Declared Value, Excess-Profits, and Capital Stock Tax Returns by the Special Committee on Un-American Activities, House of Representatives	1942-12-09
3466	9282	Transferring Jurisdiction Over Certain Lands From the Secretary of Agriculture to the Secretary of War for Military Purposes	1942-12-15
3467	9283	Amendment of Executive Order No. 9226 of August 19, 1942, Prescribing Regulations Governing the Furnishing of Clothing in Kind or Payment of Cash Allowances in Lieu Thereof to Enlisted Men of the Navy, the Coast Guard, the Naval Reserve, and the Coast Guard Reserve	1942-12-18
3468	9284	Transferring Certain Personnel of the Coast and Geodetic Survey to the Navy Department	1942-12-22
3469	9285	Establishing the United States of America Typhus Commission	1942-12-24
3470	9286	Medal for Merit	1942-12-24
3471	9287	Transferring Certain Functions From the Council of National Defense to the Secretary of the Interior	1942-12-24
3472	9288	Transferring the Control and Jurisdiction Over Certain Tracts of Land From the Secretary of the Interior to the Secretary of Agriculture for Administrative Purposes	1942-12-24
3473	9289	Regulations Governing the Payment of Overtime Compensation to Employees of the Executive Departments and Agencies	1942-12-26
3474	9290	Suspension of Eight-Hour Law as to Laborers and Mechanics Employed by the War Department on Public Works Within the United States	1942-12-28
3475	9291	Authorizing the Procurement Division of the Department of the Treasury To Use Block Mica Acquired Pursuant to the Act of June 7, 1939	1942-12-29
3476	9292	Establishing the Hailstone National Wildlife Refuge	1942-12-31

=== 1943 ===
Relative No.	Absolute No.	Title / Description	Date signed
3477	9293	Quarry Heights Military Reservation, Canal Zone	1943-01-02
3478	9294	Further Defining the Functions and Duties of the Office of Defense Transportation	1943-01-04
3479	9295	Amending Executive Order No. 9206 of July 27, 1942, Prescribing Regulations Governing the Granting of Allowances for Quarters and Subsistence to Enlisted Men	1943-01-09
3480	9296	Amending Paragraph 1 of Title II of Executive Order No. 9001 of December 27, 1941 Concerning Reports of Contracts and Purchases Made Under Authority of Title II of the First War Powers Act, 1941	1943-01-30
3481	9297	Making Certain Changes in the Customs Field Organization	1943-02-01
3482	9298	Amending Subdivisions VII and XVI of Schedule A of the Civil Service Rules	1943-02-02
3483	9299	Prescribing Regulations and Procedures With Respect to Wage and Salary Adjustments for Employees Subject to the Railway Labor Act	1943-02-04
3484	9300	Establishing the Interdepartmental Committee to Consider Cases of Subversive Activity on the Part of Federal Employees	1943-02-05
3485	9301	Establishing a Minimum Wartime Work-Week of Forty-Eight Hours	1943-02-09
3486	9302	Transferring to the Commissioner of Internal Revenue Certain Functions Relating to Taxes and Penalties Imposed for Violations of the National Prohibition Act	1943-02-09
3487	9303	Amending the Foreign Service Regulations of the United States	1943-02-11
3488	9304	Designating the Honorable Martin Travieso as Acting Judge of the District Court of the United States for Puerto Rico	1943-02-23
3489	9305	Transfer of Certain Personnel Among the Coast and Geodetic Survey and the War and Navy Departments	1943-02-23
3490	9306	Possession Relinquished of Plants of Triumph Explosives, Inc., Located at Elkton, Maryland	1943-02-27
3491	9307	Amending Executive Order No. 8384 of March 29, 1940, Prescribing Regulations Relating to Annual Leave of Government Employees	1943-03-03
3492	9308	Revoking the Designation of Gastonia, North Carolina, as a Customs Port of Entry in Customs Collection District Number 15 (North Carolina)	1943-03-03
3493	9309	Controlling Government Requests for the Selective Service Deferment of Federal Employees	1943-03-06
3494	9310	Transferring the Nutrition Functions of the Office of Defense Health and Welfare Services to the Department of Agriculture	1943-03-06
3495	9311	Enlarging the Squaw Creek National Wildlife Refuge	1943-03-06
3496	9312	Defining the Foreign Information Activities of the Office of War Information	1943-03-09
3497	9313	Extension of the Provisions of Executive Order No. 9231 of August 20, 1942, to the Construction of Red Mountain Chromite Road in the Territory of Alaska	1943-03-12
3498	9314	Revoking Executive Order No. 8955 of December 1, 1941, Extending the Classification Act of 1923, as Amended, to Certain Positions in the War Department and in the Navy Department and Establishing a Salary Differential Therefore	1943-03-15
3499	9315	Transferring Certain Functions From the President to the Secretary of Agriculture	1943-03-15
3500	9316	Amending Section 8 of Executive Order No. 8942 of November 19, 1941, Entitled Providing for the Administration of the Requisitioning of Property Required for National Defense	1943-03-19
3501	9317	Making Available for the Use of the Army and Navy Quinine Sulfate Acquired by the Procurement Division of the Treasury Department Pursuant to the Act of June 7, 1939	1943-03-20
3502	9318	Reinstatement of Former Foreign Service Officer Maxwell M. Hamilton	1943-03-20
3503	9319	Amending Executive Order No. 9276 Entitled Establishing the Petroleum Administration for War and Defining its Functions and Duties	1943-03-23
3504	9320	Amending Executive Order No. 9108 of March 21, 1942, Directing the Director of the Office of Defense Transportation To Take Control of the Toledo, Peoria and Western Railroad Company	1943-03-24
3505	9321	Authorizing the Attorney General To Acquire and Dispose of Property	1943-03-25
3506	9322	Centralizing and Delegating Authority With Respect to the Production and Distribution of Food	1943-03-26
3507	9323	Amendment of Executive Order No. 8809 of June 28, 1941, Establishing the Good Conduct Medal	1943-03-21
3508	9324	Amending the Manual for Courts-Martial, United States Army (1928)	1943-03-31
3509	9325	Payment of Expenses of the Office of Alien Property Custodian	1943-04-07
3510	9326	Transfer of Jurisdiction Over Certain Land Containing Oil and Gas Deposits From the War Department to the Department of the Interior	1943-04-07
3511	9327	Providing for the More Effective Handling of Governmental Problems in Congested Production Areas in Order To Further the Successful Prosecution of the War	1943-04-07
3512	9328	Stabilization of Wages, Prices, and Salaries	1943-04-08
3513	9329	Designating the Chairman of the United States Maritime Commission	1943-04-16
3514	9330	Transfer of Certain Central Administrative Services of the Office for Emergency Management	1943-04-16
3515	9331	Medal for Merit	1943-04-19
3516	9332	Establishing the Solid Fuels Administration for War	1943-04-19
3517	9333	Amending Subdivision XXIX of Schedule A of the Civil Service Rules	1943-04-19
3518	9334	War Food Administration	1943-04-19
3519	9335	Providing Additional Members of the War Production Board	1943-04-19
3520	9336	Authorizing Financing Arrangements To Facilitate the Prosecution of the War	1943-04-24
3521	9337	Authorizing the Secretary of the Interior To Withdraw and Reserve Lands of the Public Domain and Other Lands Owned or Controlled by the United States	1943-04-24
3522	9338	Abolishing the Office of Defense Health and Welfare Services and Transferring its Functions to the Federal Security Agency	1943-04-29
3523	9339	Transfer of Civil Air Patrol From the Office of Civilian Defense to the Department of War	1943-04-29
3524	9340	Possession and Operation of Coal Mines	1943-05-01
3525	9341	Directing the Director of the Office of Defense Transportation To Take Control of the Properties of the American Railroad Company of Porto [sic] Rico	1943-05-13
3526	9342	Amending Executive Order No. 8970 of December 11, 1941, Establishing Certain Defensive Sea Areas	1943-05-19
3527	9343	Transferring Jurisdiction and Control Over Certain Lands on Government Island, California, to the Navy Department	1943-05-19
3528	9344	Changing the Name of the Alley Dwelling Authority to National Capital Housing Authority	1943-05-21
3529	9345	Inspection of Income, Excess-Profits, and Declared Value Excess-Profits Tax Returns by the Naval Affairs Investigating Committee, House of Representatives	1943-05-27
3530	9346	Further Amending Executive Order No. 8802 by Establishing a New Committee on Fair Employment Practice and Defining its Powers and Duties	1943-05-27
3531	9347	Providing for the Establishment of an Office of War Mobilization	1943-05-27
3532	9348	Amending Section 9 of Executive Order No. 8588 Entitled Prescribing Regulations Governing the Payment of Expenses of Transportation of Household Goods and Personal Effects of Certain Civilian Officers and Employees of the United States	1943-06-03
3533	9349	Possession Relinquished of Plants of Milford Ordnance Company, Inc., and Sussex Ordnance Company	1943-06-04
3534	9350	Conferring Certain Additional Authority Upon the Administrator of the War Shipping Administration	1943-06-10
3535	9351	Authorizing the Secretary of War To Take Possession of and Operate the Plant of the Howarth Pivoted Bearings Company at Philadelphia, Pennsylvania	1943-06-14
3536	9352	Entry of Alien Seamen into the United States	1943-06-15
3537	9353	Disposal of Electric Energy Generated at the Norfork Project	1943-06-19
3538	9354	Designating the Chairman of the Securities and Exchange Commission as Member of the Economic Stabilization Board	1943-06-23
3539	9355	Amendment of Executive Order No. 9226 of August 10, 1942, Prescribing Regulations Governing the Furnishing in Kind or in Payment of Cash in Lieu Thereof to Enlisted Men in the Navy, the Coast Guard, the Naval Reserve, and the Coast Guard Reserve	1943-06-24
3540	9356	Regulations Governing the Furnishing of Clothing in Kind or Payment of Cash Allowances in Lieu Thereof to Enlisted Personnel of the Navy, the Coast Guard, the Naval Reserve, and the Coast Guard Reserve	1943-06-24
3541	9357	Transferring the Functions of the Public Works Administration to the Federal Works Administration	1943-06-30
3542	9358	Providing for the Functions of the Board of Legal Examiners	1943-07-01
3543	9359	Suspending Certain Statutory Provisions Relating to Employment in the Canal Zone	1943-07-01
3544	9360	Suspension of Eight-Hour Law as to Laborers and Mechanics Employed by the Department of the Interior on Public Works Within the United States	1943-07-07
3545	9361	Supplementing the Executive Order Establishing the Office of War Mobilization and Providing for the Unifying of Foreign Economic Affairs	1943-07-15
3546	9362	Transferring Certain Land From the Jurisdiction of the Federal Communications Commission to the Jurisdiction of the Navy Department	1943-07-21
3547	9363	Redistributing Certain Functions of the Secretary of War and the Judge Advocate General With Respect to Certain Court-Martial Cases	1943-07-23
3548	9364	Prescribing the Strength of the Women's Army Corps	1943-07-26
3549	9365	Women's Army Corps Service Medal	1943-07-29
3550	9366	Relating to the Operation and Disposition of Electric Energy at the Dennison Dam, Grand River Dam, and Norfork Dam in the States of Texas, Oklahoma, and Arkansas	1943-07-30
3551	9367	Prohibiting, With Certain Exceptions, Instruction of Applicants for Civil Service and Foreign Service Examinations by Officers or Employees of the Government	1943-08-04
3552	9368	Suspension of the Eight-Hour Law as to Laborers and Mechanics Employed by the Department of the Interior on Public Works Within the Territory of Alaska	1943-08-09
3553	9369	Providing for the Liquidation of the Affairs of the Office of the Bituminous Coal Consumers' Counsel	1943-08-16
3554	9370	Authorizing the Economic Stabilization Director To Take Certain Action in Connection With the Enforcement of Directives of the National War Labor Board	1943-08-16
3555	9371	Amendment of Section 9 of Executive Order No. 8384 of March 29, 1940, Prescribing Regulations Relating to Annual Leave of Government Employees	1943-08-24
3556	9372	Excepting Certain Persons From the Classification of Alien Enemy for the Purposes of Permitting Them To Apply for Naturalization	1943-08-27
3557	9373	Operation of, and Disposition of Electric Energy at, the Denison Dam, the Grand River Dam, and the Norfork Dam in the States of Texas, Oklahoma, and Arkansas	1943-08-30
3558	9374	Transfer of Certain Personnel Between the Coast and Geodetic Survey and the Navy Department	1943-09-03
3559	9375	Authorizing the War Shipping Administration To Take Possession of and Operate the Plant of the Atlantic Basin Iron Works, Incorporated, at Brooklyn, New York	1943-09-03
3560	9376	Reinstating John W. Bailey, Jr., in the Foreign Service	1943-09-18
3561	9377	Relinquishing Possession of the Plant of the Atlantic Basin Iron Works, Incorporated, at Brooklyn, New York	1943-09-22
3562	9378	Amendment of Executive Order No. 9062 of February 16, 1942, Authorizing the Civil Service Commission To Adopt Special Procedures Relating to Recruitment, Placement, and Changes in Status of Personnel for the Federal Service	1943-09-23
3563	9379	Establishing a Special Emergency Board To Report on the Adjustment of Wages for Employees of the Pacific Electric Railway Company of Los Angeles, California	1943-09-23
3564	9380	Foreign Economic Administration	1943-09-25
3565	9381	Amendment of Executive Order No. 9250, Entitled Providing for the Stabilization of the National Economy	1943-09-25
3566	9382	Making Certain Changes in the Customs Field Organization	1943-09-25
3567	9383	Coordination of Functions and Policies of Federal Civil Agencies in Puerto Rico and the Virgin Islands	1943-10-05
3568	9384	Submission of Reports to Facilitate Budgeting Activities of the Federal Government	1943-10-04
3569	9385	Foreign Food Procurement and Development	1943-10-06
3570	9386	Regulations Governing the Granting of Allowances for Quarters and Subsistence to Enlisted Men	1943-10-15
3571	9387	Establishing an Advisory Board on Just Compensation and Prescribing its Functions	1943-10-15
3572	9388	Establishing a Special Emergency Board To Report on Claims for Wage Adjustments of Nonoperating Railway Employees	1943-10-16
3573	9389	Amendment of Certain Paragraphs of the Executive Orders Establishing the Offices of Scientific Research and Development, Coordinator of Inter-American Affairs, Defense Transportation, and Civilian Defense	1943-10-18
3574	9390	Transferring the Use, Possession, and Control of Certain Lands in the Nantahala National Forest From the Department of Agriculture to the Tennessee Valley Authority	1943-10-25
3575	9391	Transferring the Use, Possession, and Control of Certain Lands in the Cherokee National Forest From the Department of Agriculture to the Tennessee Valley Authority	1943-10-26
3576	9392	Amendment of Executive Order 9334 Entitled War Food Administration	1943-10-28
3577	9393	Possession and Operation of Coal Mines	1943-11-01
3578	9394	Amending Subdivision VII of Schedule A of the Civil Service Rules	1943-11-04
3579	9395	Additional Compensation of Enlisted Personnel of the Marine Corps Regularly Detailed as Messmen	1943-11-08
3580	9395-A	Amending Executive Order No. 9017 of January 12, 1942, To Provide for Alternate Public Members of the National War Labor Board	1943-11-20
3581	9395-B	Possession of Leather Manufacturing Plants Located in Salem, Peabody, and Danvers, Massachusetts	1943-11-20
3582	9396	Authorizing the Secretary of War To Issue Citations in the Name of the President of the United States to Army Units for Outstanding Performance in Action	1943-11-22
3583	9397	Numbering System for Federal Accounts Relating to Individual Persons	1943-11-22
3584	9398	Extension of Trust Periods on Indian Lands Expiring During Calendar Year 1944	1943-11-25
3585	9399	Authorizing the Secretary of the Navy To Take Possession of and Operate Part of the Plant and Facilities of Remington Rand, Inc., in the Town of Southport, County of Chemung, State of New York	1943-11-25
3586	9400	Authorizing the Secretary of the Navy To Take Possession of and Operate the Shipyard of the Los Angeles Shipbuilding and Drydock Corporation at Los Angeles, California	1943-12-03
3587	9401	Suspension of Eight-Hour Law as to Laborers and Mechanics Employed by the Department of Agriculture, Including the War Food Administration	1943-12-07
3588	9402	Designating Dr. R. R. Sayers, Director of the Bureau of Mines, To Act as Under Secretary, First Assistant Secretary, or Assistant Secretary of the Interior	1943-12-07
3589	9403	Relinquishing Possession of Leather Manufacturing Plants Located in Salem, Peabody, and Danvers, Massachusetts	1943-12-13
3590	9404	Authorizing the Governor of the Panama Canal To Acquire and Dispose of Property	1943-12-17
3591	9405	Amending Subdivision IX of Schedule A of the Civil Service Rules	1943-12-17
3592	9406	Transfer of Functions With Respect to Necessity Certificates From the Secretary of War and the Secretary of the Navy to the Chairman of the War Production Board	1943-12-17
3593	9407	Amending the Foreign Service Regulations of the United States	1943-12-17
3594	9408	Authorizing the Secretary of War To Take Possession of and Operate the Point Breeze Plants and Facilities of the Western Electric Company, Incorporated, in and Near the City of Baltimore, Maryland	1943-12-19
3595	9409	Altering the Composition of the War Manpower Commission	1943-12-23
3596	9410	Delegation of Certain Functions of the President to the Director of Selective Service	1943-12-23
3597	9411	Prescribing Rates for Hospitalization and Medical Care of Dependents of Naval Personnel and Others	1943-12-23
3598	9412	Possession and Operation of Railroads	1943-12-27

=== 1944 ===
Relative No.	Absolute No.	Title / Description	Date signed
3599	9413	Establishing a Special Emergency Board To Report on the Claims for Wage Adjustments of Non-Operating Railway Employees	1944-01-04
3600	9414	Regulations Relating to Annual and Sick Leave of Government Employees	1944-01-13
3601	9415	Transfer of Certain Personnel of the Coast and Geodetic Survey to the War Department	1944-01-20
3602	9416	Authorizing the Secretary of the Navy To Take Possession of and Operate the Plants of the York Safe & Lock Company, York County, Pennsylvania	1944-01-21
3603	9417	Establishing a War Refugee Board	1944-01-22
3604	9418	Authorizing the War Food Administration To Place Orders With Other Agencies for Materials or Services To Be Obtained by Contract or Otherwise	1944-01-29
3605	9419	Bronze Star Medal	1944-02-04
3606	9420	Authorizing the Secretary of War To Take Possession of and Operate the Plants and Facilities of Arkwright Corp., Berkshire Fine Spinning Associates, Inc., Border City Manufacturing Co., Bourne Mills, Howard Arthur Mills, Richard Borden Manufacturing Co., and Sagamore Manufacturing Co., in and About Fall River, Massachusetts	1944-02-07
3607	9421	Designating the Chairman of the Board of Governors of the Federal Reserve System	1944-02-08
3608	9422	Ratifying the Use by the Army Air Forces of Certain Optical Glass	1944-02-09
3609	9423	Transfer of the War Relocation Authority to the Department of the Interior	1944-02-16
3610	9424	Establishing in the United States Patent Office a Register of Government Interest in Patents and Applications for Patents	1944-02-18
3611	9425	Establishing the Surplus War Property Administration	1944-02-19
3612	9426	Authorizing the Secretary of War To Take Possession of and Operate Plants, Facilities, Installations and Other Properties in California and Nevada of the Department of Water and Power, of the City of Los Angeles, California	1944-02-23
3613	9427	Establishment of the Retraining and Reemployment Administration	1944-02-24
3614	9427-A	Assignment of Frequencies to Government Radio Stations	1944-03-01
3615	9428	Authorizing Certain Former Employees of the Federal Bureau of Investigation, Department of Justice, To Acquire a Competitive Classified Status	1944-03-01
3616	9429	Amending Executive Order 9406 of December 17, 1943	1944-03-02
3617	9430	Inspection by the Office of Price Administration of Corporation Statistical Transcript Cards Prepared From Income and Declared Excess Profits Tax Returns	1944-03-07
3618	9431	Amending the Foreign Service Regulations of the United States	1944-03-20
3619	9432	Designation of Under Secretary and Assistant Secretaries of the Interior To Act as Secretary of the Interior	1944-03-28
3620	9433	Extending the Limits of Certain Customs Ports of Entry	1944-04-06
3621	9434	Naval Radio Station, Summit, Canal Zone	1944-04-08
3622	9435	Authorizing the Secretary of the Navy To Take Possession of and To Operate the Plants and Facilities of Jenkins Brothers, Inc., at Bridgeport, Connecticut	1944-04-13
3623	9436	Authorizing the Secretary of War To Take Possession of and To Operate the Plants and Facilities of the Ken-Rad Tube and Lamp Corporation and Ken-Rad Transmitting Tube Corporation at Owensboro, Kentucky	1944-04-13
3624	9437	Revocation of Executive Order No. 9165, Providing for the Protection of Certain Facilities From Sabotage and Other Destructive Acts	1944-04-18
3625	9438	Authorizing the Secretary of Commerce To Take Possession of and To Operate the Plants and Facilities of Montgomery Ward and Company Located in Chicago, Illinois	1944-04-25
3626	9439	Establishing a Uniform Monthly Rate of Pay for Student Nurses Transferred to Federal Hospitals	1944-05-04
3627	9440	Authorizing the Reconstruction Finance Corporation To Place Orders With Other Agencies for Materials or Services To Be Obtained by Contract or Otherwise	1944-05-09
3628	9441	Suspension of the Eight-Hour Law as to Laborers and Mechanics Employed by the Veterans' Administration on Public Work Within the United States	1944-05-11
3629	9442	Waiving the Provisions of Executive Order of January 13, 1873, as to Eugene E. Dickerson, Postmaster at Warmsprings, Montana	1944-05-15
3630	9443	Authorizing the Secretary of War To Take Possession of and To Operate the Plants and Facilities of the Hummer Manufacturing Division of Montgomery Ward & Company, Incorporated, at Springfield, Illinois	1944-05-20
3631	9444	Inspection of Income, Excess-Profits, Declared Value Excess-Profits, and Capital Stock Tax Returns by the Special Committee on Un-American Activities	1944-05-25
3632	9445	Designation of the Honorable Harold Martin Travieso, Chief Justice of the Supreme Court of Puerto Rico, To Act as Acting Judge of the District Court of the United States for Puerto Rico in the Case of United States v. Julio Trinidad Geigel	1944-05-29
3633	9446	Regulations Governing the Allowance of Travel Expenses of Claimants and Beneficiaries of the Veterans' Administration and of Their Attendants	1944-06-08
3634	9447	Amendment of Executive Order 9356 of June 24, 1943, Prescribing Regulations Governing the Furnishing of Clothing in Kind or Payment of Cash Allowances in Lieu Thereof to Enlisted Personnel of the Navy, the Coast Guard, the Naval Reserve, and the Coast Guard Reserve	1944-06-08
3635	9448	Inspection of Income, Excess-Profits, and Capital Stock Tax Returns by the Select Committee To Investigate the Federal Communications Commission, House of Representatives	1944-06-08
3636	9449	Amending Regulations Concerning Foreign Service Pay Adjustment	1944-06-15
3637	9450	Amending Foreign Service Regulations of the United States	1944-06-20
3638	9451	Revoking Paragraph 2 of Executive Order 9243 of September 12, 1942, Entitled Providing for the Transfer and Release of Federal Personnel	1944-06-20
3639	9451-A	Confidential—Concerning Alloys	1944-06-22
3640	9452	Authorizing the Secretary of State To Prescribe Regulations Relating to the Foreign Service of the United States	1944-06-26
3641	9453	Participation by the United States in the Work of the United Nations Relief and Rehabilitation Administration	1944-07-06
3642	9454	Temporary Appointments as Officers in the Army of the United States of Members of the Army Nurse Corps and Female Dietetic and Physical-Therapy Personnel of the Medical Department of the Army	1944-07-10
3643	9455	Inspection of Income, Excess-Profits, Declared Value Excess-Profits, and Capital Stock Tax Returns by the Select Committee To Investigate the Federal Communications Commission, House of Representatives	1944-07-11
3644	9456	Suspending Certain Statutory Provisions Relating to Employment in the Canal Zone	1944-07-13
3645	9457	Reinstating Philip W. Bonsal in the Foreign Service of the United States	1944-07-19
3646	9458	Amending Paragraphs 6 and 7 of Executive Order No. 9195 of July 7, 1942, Prescribing Regulations Relating to Aerial Flights by Personnel of the Army, Navy, Marine Corps, Coast Guard, and National Guard	1944-07-22
3647	9459	Philadelphia Transportation Company, Possession and Control by the Secretary of War	1944-08-03
3648	9460	Regulations Relating to Glider Flights by Personnel of the Army, Navy, Marine Corps, and Coast Guard	1944-08-07
3649	9461	Abolishing the Executive Committee on Commercial Policy	1944-08-07
3650	9461-A	The Honorable A. Cecil Snyder Designated as Acting Judge of the District Court of the United States for Puerto Rico	1944-08-08
3651	9462	Possession and Operation of Certain Motor Carrier Transportation Systems	1944-08-11
3652	9463	Authorizing the Secretary of the Navy To Take Possession of and Operate the Plants and Facilities of the Pacific Gear and Tool Works, the Federal Mogul Company, the Link-Blet Company (Pacific Division), the U.S. Pipe and Manufacturing Company, and the Enterprise Engine and Foundry Company, Located at San Francisco, California	1944-08-12
3653	9464	Transferring the Use, Possession, and Control of Certain Land in the Nantahala National Forest From the Department of Agriculture to the Tennessee Valley Authority	1944-08-12
3654	9465	Amendment of Executive Order 9356 of June 24, 1943, Prescribing Regulations Governing the Furnishing of Clothing in Kind or Payment of Cash Allowances in Lieu Thereof to Enlisted Personnel of the Navy, Coast Guard, Naval Reserve, and Coast Guard Reserve	1944-08-12
3655	9466	Authorizing the Secretary of the Navy To Take Possession of and Operate the Plants and Facilities of Certain Machine Shop Companies	1944-08-19
3656	9467	Amendment of Executive Order No. 1888 of February 2, 1914, as Amended, Relating to Conditions of Employment in the Service of the Panama Canal and the Panama Railroad Company on the Isthmus of Panama	1944-08-19
3657	9468	Transfer of Certain Personnel Among the Coast and Geodetic Survey and the War and Navy Department	1944-08-22
3658	9469	Authorizing the Secretary of the Interior To Take Possession of and Operate the Mines, Collieries, and Facilities of the Philadelphia and Reading Coal and Iron Company in the State of Pennsylvania	1944-08-23
3659	9470	Establishing a Method of Determining the Amounts of Bonds of Collectors of Customs	1944-08-25
3660	9471	Disposition of the Functions and Termination of the Division of Central Administrative Services of the Office for Emergency Management	1944-08-25
3661	9472	Establishing Certain Awards for the Merchant Marine	1944-08-29
3662	9473	Authorizing the Secretary of War To Take Possession of and Operate the Plants and Facilities of the International Nickel Company, Inc., Located in and Around Huntington, West Virginia	1944-08-29
3663	9474	Authorizing the Secretary of the Interior To Take Possession of and Operate the Mines, Collieries, and Preparation Facilities of the Ford Collieries Company of Curtisville, Pennsylvania, and Rochester and Pittsburgh Coal Company of Indiana, Pennsylvania	1944-08-31
3664	9475	Transferring the Functions and Responsibilities of the Rubber Director	1944-09-01
3665	9475-A	Authorizing the Secretary of War To Take Possession of and Operate Certain Plants and Facilities of the Hughes Tool Company Located at Houston, Texas	1944-09-02
3666	9476	Authorizing the Secretary of the Interior To Take Possession of and Operate the Mines, Collieries, and Preparation Facilities of Certain Coal Companies	1944-09-03
3667	9477	Authorizing the Secretary of War To Take Possession of and Operate the Plants and Facilities of Cleveland Graphite Company Located at Cleveland, Ohio	1944-09-05
3668	9478	Authorizing the Secretary of the Interior To Take Possession of and Operate Mines, Collieries, and Preparation Facilities of Certain Coal Companies	1944-09-06
3669	9479	Amending Executive Order No. 7021 of April 19, 1935, Authorizing the Governor of the Panama Canal To Arrange for the Operation by the Panama Railroad Company of Panama Canal Piers	1944-09-06
3670	9480	Authorizing the Secretary of War To Take Possession of and Operate the Plants and Facilities of the Twentieth Century Brass Works, Inc., Located at Minneapolis, Minnesota	1944-09-09
3671	9481	Authorizing the Secretary of the Interior To Take Possession of and Operate Certain Mines, Collieries, and Preparation Facilities	1944-09-12
3672	9482	Authorizing the Secretary of the Interior To Take Possession of and Operate Certain Mines, Collieries, and Preparation Facilities	1944-09-14
3673	9483	Authorizing the Secretary of the Interior To Take Possession of and Operate Certain Mines, Collieries, and Preparation Facilities	1944-09-19
3674	9484	Authorizing the Secretary of War To Take Possession of and Operate the Plants and Facilities of the Farrell Cheek Steel Company Located at Sandusky, Ohio	1944-09-23
3675	9485	Relinquishing Possession of the Plant and Facilities of the Remington Rand, Inc., in the Town of Southport, County of Chemung, State of New York	1944-09-30
3676	9486	Transfer of Functions With Respect to Non-Necessity Certificates From the Secretary of War and the Secretary of the Navy to the Chairman of the War Production Board	1944-09-30
3677	9487	Regulations Governing the Issuance of Non-Necessity Certificates Under Section 124 (d) of the Internal Revenue Code	1944-09-30
3678	9488	Transfer of the Records, Property, Funds and Personnel of the Office of War Mobilization and Its Constituent Agencies	1944-10-03
3679	9489	Authorizing and Directing the Secretary of War To designate a Military Commander for the Territory of Hawaii, and the Military Commander To Prescribe Said Territory, or Any Part Thereof, as a Military Area, and for Other Purposes	1944-10-18
3680	9490	Transfer of Functions of the Secretary of War and the Secretary of the Navy Under Section 124 of the Internal Revenue Code, to the Chairman of the War Production Board	1944-10-20
3681	9491	Regulations Governing the Issuance of Payment Certificates Under Section 124 (h) of the Internal Revenue Code	1944-10-21
3682	9492	Regulations Governing Non-Military and Non-Naval Transportation on Army and Navy Air Transports	1944-10-24
3683	9493	Authorizing and Directing the Secretary of the Navy To Take Possession of the Plants and Facilities of Lord Manufacturing Company, Located at Erie, Pennsylvania	1944-10-24
3684	9494	Authorizing the Civil Service Commission To Confer a Classified Status Upon Certain Employees of the Department of Justice	1944-10-30
3685	9495	Extension of the Provisions of Executive Order No. 9177 of May 30, 1942, to the United States Maritime Commission and the Administrator of the War Shipping Administration	1944-10-30
3686	9496	Authorizing the Secretary of War To Take Possession of and Operate Plants and Facilities of Certain Companies Located in or Near Toledo, Ohio	1944-11-03
3687	9497	Amendment of Executive Order No. 9039 Authorizing Sick and Rest Leave for Alien Employees of the Panama Canal and the Panama Canal Company, and Correction of Section 4 of Executive Order No. 9467 Relating to Conditions of Employment in the Service of the Panama Canal and Panama Railroad Company	1944-11-06
3688	9498	Amending Executive Order 9079 of February 26, 1942, Making Certain Public Health Service Hospitals Available for the Care and Treatment of Insane Persons	1944-11-11
3689	9499	Inspection of Income, Excess-Profits, Declared Value Excess-Profits, and Capital Stock Tax Returns by the Department of Commerce	1944-11-11
3690	9500	Extension of Trust Periods on Indian Lands Expiring During Calendar Year 1945	1944-11-14
3691	9501	Regulations Governing the Recall to Active Duty of Retired Commissioned Officers of the Public Health Service	1944-11-21
3692	9502	Establishing Special Temporary Positions in the Public Health Service	1944-11-24
3693	9503	Appointment of Disabled Veterans Completing Courses of Instruction Prescribed Pursuant to the Act of March 24, 1943	1944-11-27
3694	9504	Revoking the Designation of Dunkirk, New York, as a Customs Port of Entry	1944-11-27
3695	9505	Authorizing the Secretary of War To Take Possession of and Operate the Plants and Facilities of the Cudahy Brothers Company of Cudahay, Wisconsin	1944-12-06
3696	9506	Modifying the Conditions Upon Which a Classified Status May be Granted	1944-12-12
3697	9507	Amending the Foreign Service Regulations of the United States	1944-12-20
3698	9508	Authorizing the Secretary of War To Take Possession of and To Operate Certain Facilities of Montgomery Ward & Co., Incorporated	1944-12-27

=== 1945 ===
Relative No.	Absolute No.	Title / Description	Date signed
3699	9509	Regulations With Respect to Uniforms of Commissioned Officers of the Public Health Service, and Governing the Wearing of Such Uniforms	1945-01-08
3700	9510	Transfer of Certain Personnel From the Coast and Geodetic Survey to the War Department	1945-01-08
3701	9511	Authorizing the Secretary of War To Take Possession of and Operate the Properties of the Cleveland Electric Illuminating Company Located in and Around Cleveland, Ohio	1945-01-12
3702	9512	Providing for Coordination of the Allocations of Field Positions Subject to the Classification Act of 1923, as Amended	1945-01-12
3703	9513	Extending the Periods of Service or Training and Service of Persons Inducted Into or Assigned to the Navy, Marine Corps, or Coast Guard	1945-01-17
3704	9514	Amending Executive Order 9452 Authorizing the Secretary of State To Prescribe Regulations and Issue Orders and Instructions Relating to the Foreign Service of the United States	1945-01-18
3705	9515	Amendment of Rule 54 of Executive Order No. 4314 of September 25, 1925, Establishing Rules Governing Navigation of the Panama Canal	1945-01-18
3706	9516	Possession and Operation of the Transportation System of the Bingham and Garfield Railway Company	1945-01-24
3707	9517	Returning Certain Land to the Jurisdiction of the Territory of Hawaii	1945-01-31
3708	9518	Designating the Honorable A.R. de Jesus as Acting Judge of the District Court of the United States for Puerto Rico	1945-01-31
3709	9519	Extension of the Provisions of Executive Order No. 9001 of December 27, 1941, to the Office of War Mobilization and Reconversion, the Office of Contract Settlement, the Surplus Property Board, and the Retraining and Reemployment Administration	1945-01-31
3710	9520	Designating the Vice Chairman of the Board of Governors of the Federal Reserve System	1945-01-31
3711	9521	Revocation of Certain Executive Orders Prescribing Regulations Relating to the Duties of Officers and Employees of the Foreign Service of the United States	1945-02-13
3712	9522	Transferring the Tomah Radio School Property at Tomah, Wisconsin, to the Control and Jurisdiction of the Veterans' Administration	1945-02-13
3713	9523	Authorizing the Secretary of War To Take Possession of and Operate the Plants and Facilities of the American Enka Corporation, Located at or Near Enka, North Carolina	1945-02-18
3714	9524	Amending Executive Order No. 9195 of July 7, 1942, Prescribing Regulations Relating to Aerial Flights by Personnel of the Army, Navy, Marine Corps, Coast Guard, and National Guard	1945-02-18
3715	9525	Amendment of Executive Order 9356 of June 24, 1943, Prescribing Regulations Governing the Furnishing of Clothing in Kind or Payment of Cash Allowances in Lieu Thereof to Enlisted Personnel of the Navy, the Coast Guard, the Naval Reserve, and the Coast Guard Reserve	1945-02-28
3716	9526	Amending Certain Executive and Public Land Orders Withdrawing Public Lands for Purposes Incident to the National Emergency and Prosecution of the War	1945-02-28
3717	9527	Relinquishing Possession of the Plants of the York Safe and Lock Company, York County, Pennsylvania	1945-02-28
3718	9528	Amending Executive Order No. 9096 To Provide a Change in the Order of Succession of Officers To Act as Secretary of the Navy	1945-03-02
3719	9529	Reinstating Paul H. Alling in the Foreign Service of the United States	1945-03-03
3720	9530	Exemption of Harry F. Hawley From Compulsory Retirement for Age	1945-03-14
3721	9531	Making Certain Changes in the Customs Field Organization	1945-03-15
3722	9532	Changing the Name of the Coordinator of Inter-American Affairs	1945-03-23
3723	9533	Changing the Name of the Customs Port of Entry of Marshfield, Oregon, to Coos Bay, Oregon	1945-03-23
3724	9534	Designating the Federal Loan Administrator and the War Food Administrator as Members of the Economic Stabilization Board	1945-04-03
3725	9535	Public Members of the National War Labor Board	1945-04-04
3726	9536	Authorizing the Secretary of the Interior To Take Possession of and Operate Certain Coal Mines	1945-04-10
3727	9537	Amending Executive Order 8396 of April 18, 1940, Prescribing Chapter I of the Foreign Service Regulations of the United States	1945-04-11

== Presidential proclamations ==
=== 1933 ===
Relative No.	Absolute No.	Title / Description	Date signed
1	2038	Calling Congress into Extraordinary Session	March 5, 1933
2	2039	Declaring Bank Holiday	March 6, 1933
3	2040	Bank Holiday	March 9, 1933
4	2047	Mediation of the Railroad Labor Dispute	June 12, 1933
5	2062	A Thanksgiving Day Proclamation	
6	2065	Repeal of the Eighteenth Amendment	December 5, 1933
7	2067	Ratifying the London Agreement on Silver	December 21, 1933
8	2068	Christmas Amnesty Proclamation for Certain War-Time Offenders Who Have Completed Their Prison Sentences	December 23, 1933
9	2070	Restoring of Non-Member Banks to the Jurisdiction of Their Own State Banking Authorities	December 30, 1933
