= Shanes (surname) =

Shanes is a surname. Notable people with the surname include:

- Eric Shanes (1944–2017), English painter and art historian
- James Shanes (born 1997), British motorcycle racer
- John Shanes (1844–1904), Union Army soldier during the American Civil War
