= February 1900 =

Month in 1900

| << | February 1900 | | | | | >> |
| Su | Mo | Tu | We | Th | Fr | Sa |
| | | | | 1 | 2 | 3 |
| 4 | 5 | 6 | 7 | 8 | 9 | 10 |
| 11 | 12 | 13 | 14 | 15 | 16 | 17 |
| 18 | 19 | 20 | 21 | 22 | 23 | 24 |
| 25 | 26 | 27 | 28 |

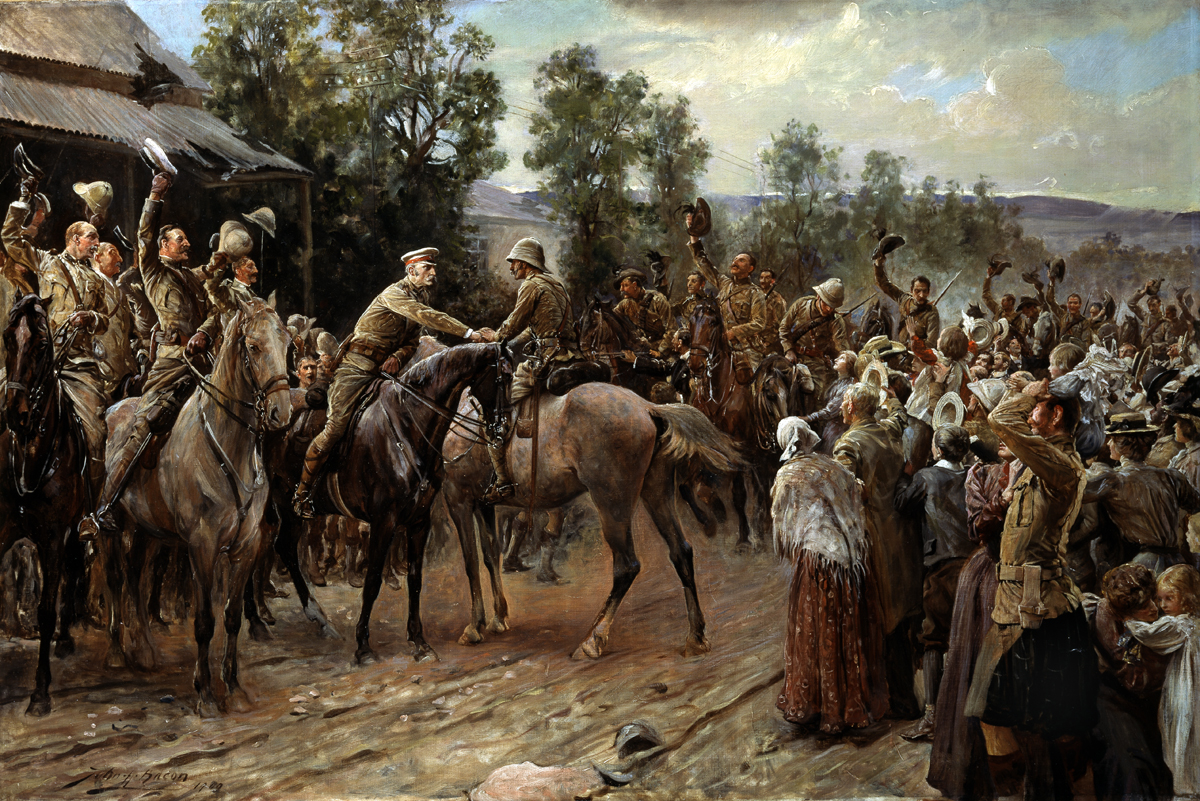
February 28, 1900: British forces defending Ladysmith rescued after a four-month siege (painting by John Henry Frederick Bacon)

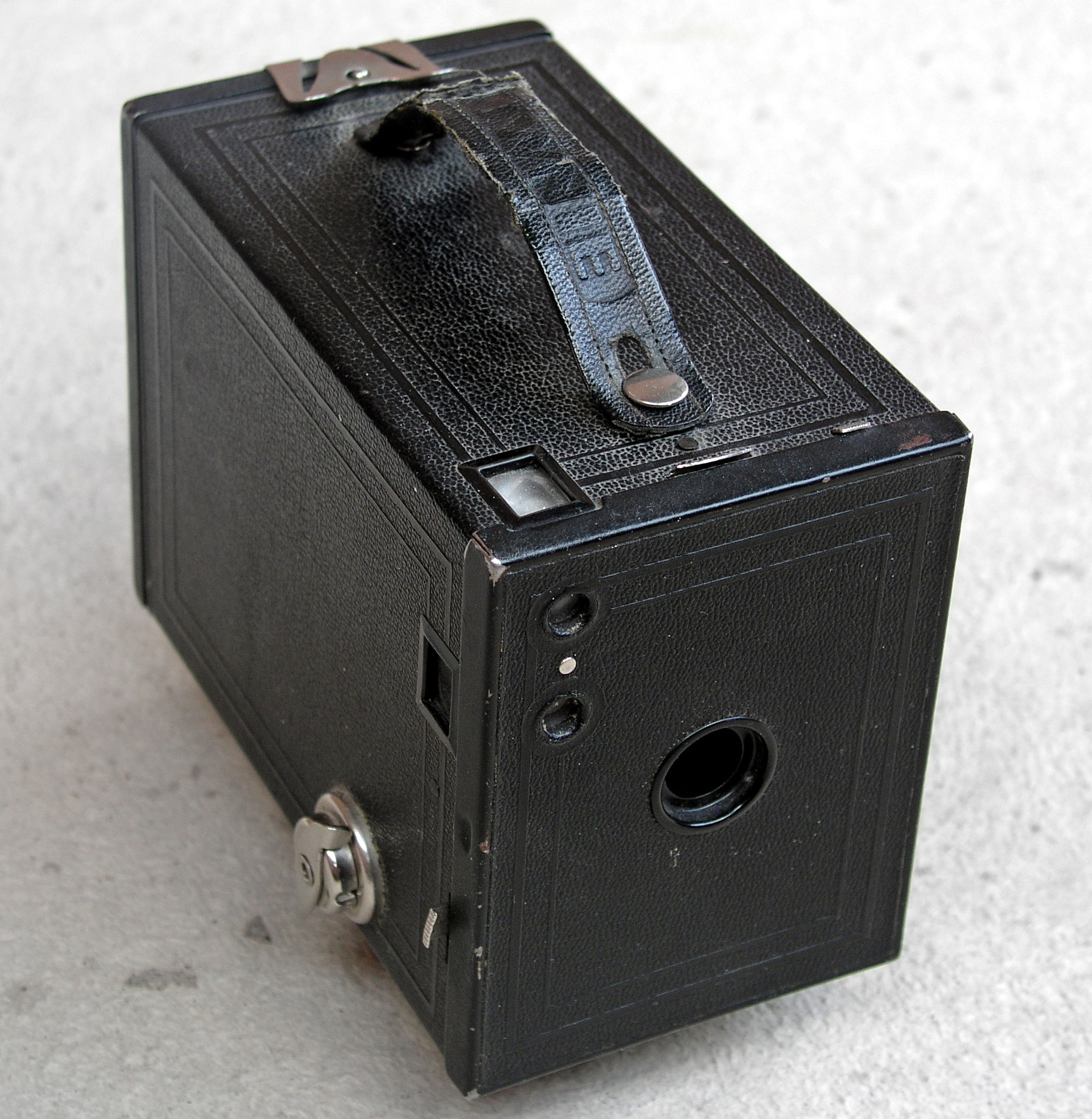
February 1, 1900: Kodak popularizes snapshots by introducing the one-dollar Brownie camera

The following events occurred in February 1900:

== February 1, 1900 (Thursday) ==
- The Eastman Kodak Company introduced the Brownie camera, shipping it to dealers on this date. The inexpensive ($1.00, equivalent to $33.47 in 2022) box camera made photography affordable to the average person, and over the next twenty months, around 245,000 of the cameras would be sold. In October 1901, Eastman would introduce the next version, the No. 1 Brownie.

== February 2, 1900 (Friday) ==
- The Manila Bulletin, the newspaper of largest circulation in the Philippines, published its first issue. Starting as a publisher of information about shipping, the broadsheet became "The Nation's Leading Newspaper".
- U.S. President William McKinley convened a cabinet meeting about election violence in Kentucky. William S. Taylor, initially declared the winner of the recent state election, had petitioned the President to be recognized as the Governor of Kentucky. Meanwhile, Taylor's Democratic opponent, William Goebel, had been declared winner of the election and had been administered the oath of office on his deathbed. United States Attorney General John W. Griggs and Secretary of War Elihu Root agreed with McKinley that there was no legal basis for Washington, D.C., to become involved in the matter. A statement was issued that "The President has decided that no case has yet arisen to justify the intervention of the National Government in Kentucky, and has so informed the Governor."

== February 3, 1900 (Saturday) ==
- Birsa Munda, the rebel leader in British India, was arrested in the woods near Porahat after seven of his followers tipped off police. He would die in prison 6 days later. Birsa is celebrated a century later as a martyr to the Indian independence movement.
- Dumbell's Bank, a principal deposit holder in the Isle of Man, failed, leaving many of the British island's businesses and residents without money.
- William Goebel, Governor of Kentucky since January 31, died at 6:44 pm at the Capitol Hotel in Frankfort, Kentucky. Lieutenant Governor J. C. W. Beckham was sworn in an hour later as the 35th Governor of Kentucky. At the same time, William S. Taylor continued to assert that he was the lawfully elected Governor of Kentucky as well.
- B. H. Roberts, would-be U.S. Representative from Utah, was arrested in Salt Lake City for unlawful cohabitation, and released on his own recognizance. The charge arose from Roberts's practice of polygamy.

== February 4, 1900 (Sunday) ==
- In Buenos Aires, Argentina, a heat wave continued into its second day. The New York Times reported that "There were 219 cases of sunstroke here Sunday, of which 124 cases were fatal. The thermometer on Saturday registered 120 degrees in the shade, with 93 of 120 cases fatal."
- Harvard University astronomy professor William Henry Pickering announced that, beginning in May, he and a team would commence a search for an "intermercurial planet", between Mercury and the Sun.
- A fire in St. Louis caused losses of more than $1,000,000 and killed fireman Charles Mebus (or Mappes), who died after a wall fell upon him. The fire started in the Penny & Gentles dry goods on Broadway and Franklin, then spread along both streets for three blocks.
- Born: Jacques Prévert, French poet and screenwriter, known for his screenplays including Children of Paradise and song lyrics including "Autumn Leaves" in Neuilly-sur-Seine, Hauts-de-Seine département (d. 1977)

== February 5, 1900 (Monday) ==
- At the United States Department of State building in Washington, D.C., State Secretary John Hay and British Ambassador to the United States Lord Pauncefote signed a treaty to amend the Clayton–Bulwer Treaty of 1850, in order to permit construction of the proposed Nicaragua Canal. The amendment (not to be confused with the Hay–Pauncefote Treaty of 1901) was then transmitted by the President to the United States Senate. A bill relating to the Nicaragua Canal would be approved by the House on May 2, but fail in the Senate.
- The United States Senate unanimously ratified the 1899 convention that created the International Arbitration Convention at The Hague.
- In New Orleans, the Republican state convention endorsed William McKinley for president, Cornelius Newton Bliss for vice-president, and Eugene S. Reems for Governor of Louisiana. "The convention was unique in the history of the State", reported The New York Times, adding "A majority of the delegates were white men."
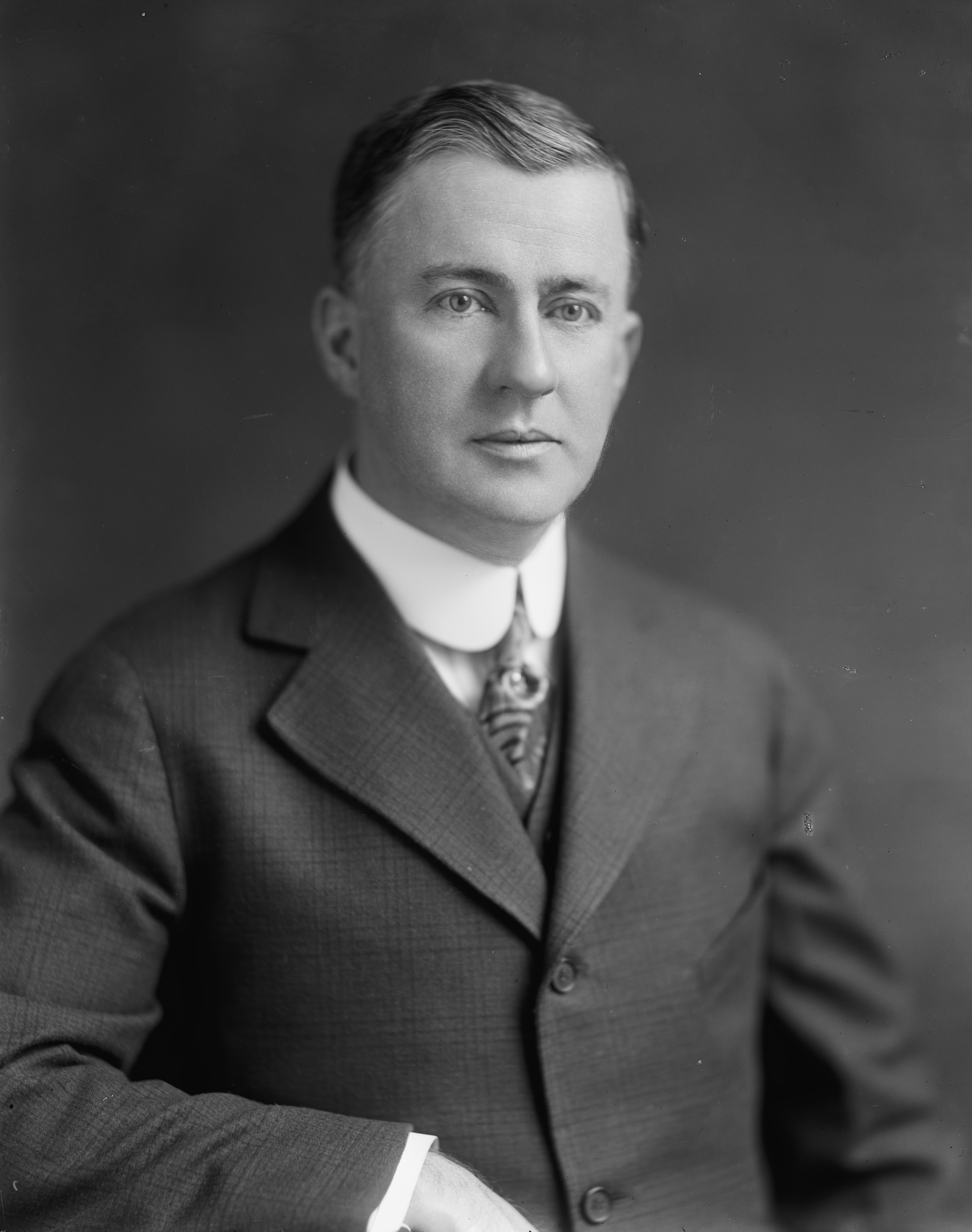
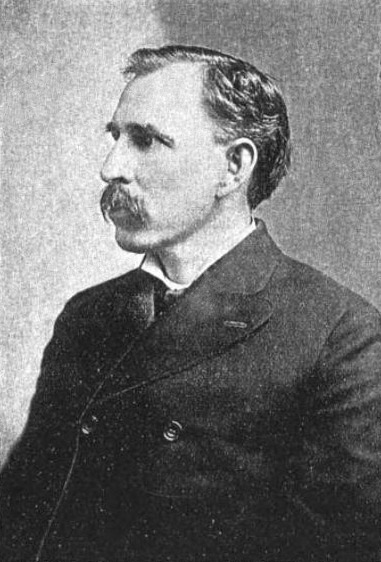
Rival Kentucky Governors Beckham and Taylor
- At a conference in the Galt House in Louisville, Kentucky, Republican and Democratic party leaders agreed that Republican Governor William S. Taylor and Lieutenant Governor John Marshall would defer to the Kentucky Legislature to decide whether Taylor or J. C. W. Beckham, should be Governor of Kentucky. The "peace agreement" averted further violence following the state election.
- Troops fired on 1,200 rioting miners in Fort-de-France, Martinique and killed at least nine people.
- Born: Adlai Stevenson, American politician, Democratic candidate for the 1952 and 1956 presidential elections, 31st Governor of Illinois, 5th U.S. Ambassador to the United Nations; in Los Angeles (d. 1965)

== February 6, 1900 (Tuesday) ==
- Recently elected to the House of Commons of the United Kingdom, MP John Redmond was selected as chair of the United Irish League. Redmond was a proponent of the movement to create the Irish Free State as a nation independent of the United Kingdom.
- The House of Commons of the United Kingdom voted on Lord FitzMaurice's motion of no confidence in the government after one week's debate. The resolution, which had been introduced following British reversals in the Second Boer War, failed by a vote of 352 to 139.
- U.S. President William McKinley appointed Judge William Howard Taft of the Sixth Circuit Court of Appeals to be the president of the newly created Philippine Commission. Taft, who would sail for the Philippines on March 1, would oversee a transition from military government to a civil rule with himself as Governor-General. Taft's successor on the bench would be Judge Henry Franklin Severens.

== February 7, 1900 (Wednesday) ==
- The Empress Dowager Cixi of China issued an edict abolishing the teaching of the "new, depraved and erroneous subjects of the Western schools", and providing that teachers who violated the rule would be punished. In addition, examinations for official rank would be revised to remove Western influences and to return to the teachings of Confucius.
- After a 13-day special session, the California State Legislature voted for Thomas R. Bard to become United States Senator, filling the seat which had been vacant since March 4, 1899. After the term of Stephen M. White had expired, the California State Senate had failed to fill the seat during its regular 1899 session. During 1899, four states (California, Delaware, Pennsylvania and Utah) had only one United States Senator apiece.
- A Chinese immigrant in San Francisco, lumber yard owner Wong Chut King, became the first person known to fall ill of bubonic plague in the San Francisco area, the first epidemic of the disease in the continental United States.

== February 8, 1900 (Thursday) ==
- In the Midwestern United States, warm weather gave way to a blizzard in the space of less than a day. "From a weather standpoint Feb. 8 was one of the most remarkable in the history of the local meteorology office", wrote one observer. In Chicago, the temperature was 62 °F (17 °C) at 7:00 am, and fell to 10 °F (−12 °C) by 11:00 pm. The drop of 52 °F (29 °C) during the day is a record that still stands.
- By a vote of 26 to 15, the States of Jersey first permitted the use of the English language in its parliamentary debates. Though the Jersey island, located off of the coast of Normandy, had been a British crown dependency since the 13th century, its local government continued to use the French language in all proceedings.

== February 9, 1900 (Friday) ==
- Dwight F. Davis, president of the United States National Lawn Tennis Association (USNLTA), announced in Boston that he would donate a silver bowl to the nation that won the international tennis championship. The United Kingdom and the United States would compete in August for what has been known, ever since, as the Davis Cup. The trophy was manufactured by the William B. Durgin Company, and accepted by the USNLTA on February 21, 1900.
- Some sources cite February 9, 1900, as the date that the Hershey bar was introduced.

== February 10, 1900 (Saturday) ==
- In competition at the Eisstation in Davos, Switzerland, Peder Østlund of Norway set two new world records in speed skating, in the 1000 and 500 meter races. The next day, Østlund set two additional records in the 1,500 meter and 10,000 meter races. Ostlund's records would stand for years. The 500 m time was not broken until 1906, by Rudolf Gundersen. Oscar Mathisen set new records in the other events; the 10 kilometer record stood until 1912.
- Aristocrat Roland B. Molineux was convicted of the December 1899 murder, by mercury cyanide poison, of Mrs. Katherine J. Adams, and sentenced to death. A jury concluded that Molineux had anonymously mailed a poisoned bottle of Bromo Seltzer to an athletic club rival, Henry Cornish, on December 21, 1899. Cornish's aunt, Mrs. Katherine B. Adams, was poisoned instead and died on December 27. The sentence would later be reversed, and Molineux would be acquitted in his 1902 trial. He died in 1917.
- The New York Times reported that over 80,000 people were preparing to move from Utah to the Bighorn Basin in northern Wyoming, where 200,000 acres (810 km^{2}) had been set aside by the state under the Carey Act.

== February 11, 1900 (Sunday) ==
- After four years, Vladimir Lenin was released from his exile to the Siberian village of Shushenskoye. He and his wife travelled by horseback for 320 kilometres (200 mi) to Ufa and arrived there on February 18.
- In Port Arthur, Texas, James Sweeney, a white man, was lynched by a mob at 1am, only hours after being acquitted of the bayonet murder of Charles Crumbach. Tried in Beaumont, Sweeney returned by train to Port Arthur. "Word had been telegraphed ahead that he was coming, and a mob met him at the station, marched him up town, and strung him up to a telegraph pole without ceremony. In the first attempt the rope broke. The second attempt was made successful by tying Sweeney's legs so that his feet could not touch the ground, and drawing the rope taut."
- The Spanish steamship Alicante arrived in Barcelona, repatriating 1,100 soldiers who had been imprisoned by rebels during the Philippine–American War.
- Born: Hans-Georg Gadamer, German philosopher, author of Truth and Method; in Marburg (d. 2002)

== February 12, 1900 (Monday) ==
- New York Governor Theodore Roosevelt released a statement to the public. "In view of the continued statements in the press that I may be urged as a candidate for vice president and in view of the many letters that reach me advising me for and against such a course, it is proper for me to state definitely that under no circumstances could I or would I accept the nomination for the vice presidency." He added, "And I am happy to state that Senator Platt cordially acquiesces in my views in the matter." Roosevelt later accepted the nomination to be U.S. President William McKinley's running mate in the upcoming presidential election, and became the 26th President of the United States upon McKinley's death the following year.
- Born: Roger J. Traynor, American judge, Chief Justice of Supreme Court of California, from 1964 to 1970; in Park City, Utah (d. 1983)

== February 13, 1900 (Tuesday) ==
- In New York City, U.S. Representative Charles A. Chickering was killed after falling from his bedroom window on the fourth floor of the Grand Union Hotel at 41st Street and Park Avenue. "While it may have been an accident or the result of walking in his sleep, the facts gathered indicated that the Congressman plunged head first from a window on the fourth floor of the Grand Union Hotel and was instantly killed," noted The New York Times, adding that "The body was attired in a night robe, indicating that the congressman had retired."
- The Imperial Order Daughters of the Empire (IODE) was founded in Fredericton, New Brunswick, by Canadian philanthropist Mrs. John Black. By the time of its centennial, the IODE had 9,000 members in Canada.

== February 14, 1900 (Wednesday) ==
- Valentine's Day of 1900 is the fictional setting for the 1967 Joan Lindsay novel Picnic at Hanging Rock, and the 1975 film adaptation. The film erroneously describes February 14, 1900, as a Saturday.
- In a turning point in the Second Boer War, British troops invaded the Orange Free State, crossing inside the Boer frontier for the first time since the war began. The invasion force consisted of 40,000 infantry and 7,000 cavalry under the command of Lord Roberts.
- General Frederick Funston was awarded the Medal of Honor for gallantry in 1899 at Luzon in the Philippines.

== February 15, 1900 (Thursday) ==
- The Siege of Kimberley was lifted, four months after the British inhabitants defended an attack by the Boers during the Second Boer War. The attack had begun on October 12, 1899. General John French led troops to liberate the city.
- In Paris, Albert Decrais, the Minister of the Colonies received a telegram from the Governor of the French Congo, reporting that Rabih az-Zubayr, the principal chieftain and warlord of central Sudan, had been defeated in battle. "He was formerly a slave of Zobohr Pasha ... but revolted and formed a kingdom of his own in Central Africa", noted The New York Times, adding "His career of victory gained for him the name of the 'African Napoleon'. The French have been fighting his power for years, and to-day's dispatch announces his overthrow." Rabih's fortress at Kouno was defended by 12,000 men with 2,500 rifles and 3 cannon. Forty-three Senegalese sharpshooters were killed and four Europeans, including Captain Robilor.

== February 16, 1900 (Friday) ==
- Three men from the Anglo-Norwegian Southern Cross Expedition, exploring Antarctica, crossed the Great Ice Barrier (now the Ross Ice Shelf) and reached a point further south than humans had ever traveled. Expedition leader Carsten Borchgrevink, Englishman William Colbeck and Norwegian Sami assistant Per Savio arrived at the latitude 78°50'S before proceeding northward back to the Southern Cross.
- In Washington, D.C., British Ambassador Lord Pauncefote, and German Ambassador Baron Theodor von Holleben met with Secretary John Hay at the State Department, and exchanged ratifications of the Samoan treaty signed by all three nations. "Secretary Hay retained for the United States the copy of the treaty which was ratified by the United States Senate. He handed to Lord Pauncefote and to Herr von Holleben copies of the treaty bearing the signatures of the President and himself", reported The New York Times. Similar proceedings took place in London and in Berlin with the foreign ministers and ambassadors, completing the Tripartite Convention of 1899. Under the treaty, the Samoan Islands were divided between the United States (as American Samoa) and Germany (later German Samoa).
- Chung Sai Yat Po (China Western Daily News), the first, and most popular, daily Chinese language newspaper in the United States, began publication. Based in San Francisco and founded by editor Ng Poon Chew, the CSYP continued until 1951.

== February 17, 1900 (Saturday) ==
- Agoli-agbo, the last nominal King of Dahomey (now Benin), was deposed after permission was given by the French government. The monarch was sent into exile and France annexed the African state.
- U.S. Senator William A. Clark of Montana testified for four hours before the Senate Committee on Elections. Clark, who had been elected by the Montana Senate, said that he had spent $115,000 but that none of it was used illegally. Following an investigation, he was refused a seat in the United States Senate.

== February 18, 1900 (Sunday) ==
- In a day remembered afterward as "Bloody Sunday", British imperial forces suffered their worst single day losses in the Second Boer War. Lord Kitchener ordered a charge downhill toward the Boer trenches at Paardeberg, and there were 1,100 casualties, including 280 deaths.
- At The Crystal Palace at Sydenham near London, two men were killed when a pair of elephants ran amok during an afternoon circus. One elephant was captured on the property after causing great damage, while the other one ran through the suburb of Beckenham and was not recaptured until late evening.

== February 19, 1900 (Monday) ==
- The Samoan island of Tutuila, "and all other islands of the group east of one hundred and seventy-one degrees west of Greenwich" was placed under the jurisdiction of the United States Department of the Navy, by U.S. President William McKinley's General Order No. 540, establishing a naval station in the South Pacific. Now American Samoa, the area remains United States territory.
- The New York Times published the report of Dr. J. M. Selfridge of Oakland, who believed that a cancerous tumor on his face had been cured by X-ray radiation, and that other patients at the Fabiola Hospital had been successfully treated as well. A mask of thin sheets of lead was placed over the face except for an aperture over the cancer itself. "The beneficial results were noted at once, and since then the cancer began to dry up. Now it is entirely healed, only a scar remaining to show where the sore was."
- Born: Giorgos Seferis, Greek writer, recipient of the Nobel Prize in Literature in 1963; in Urla, Ottoman Empire (d. 1971)

== February 20, 1900 (Tuesday) ==
- Chief Washakie, who had been leader of the Shoshone Indian tribe for seventy-eight years, died at the age of 97 at his home, located a mile north of the Wyoming fort that bore his name. Washakie, who was instrumental in the peaceful settlement of Wyoming, was buried with full military honors by the United States Army at his funeral on February 23. In 2000, the state of Wyoming donated a statue of Washakie for display in the United States Capitol.
- J.F. Pickering, African American inventor, was issued U.S. Patent No. 643,975 for the first dirigible powered by an electric motor, and the first to have directional control.
- War between Nicaragua and Costa Rica appeared imminent. Ambassador William L. Merry sent a dispatch from Costa Rica to United States Secretary of State John Hay advising "Revolutionary invasion expected from Nicaragua. Martial law declared. Troops moving to the frontier." The conflict was due in part to a dispute over land in northern Costa Rica at the Guanacaste Province, the harboring of Nicaraguan rebel Federico Mora, and a dislike between President José Santos Zelaya of Nicaragua and President Rafael Iglesias Castro of Costa Rica. The trigger may have been the tearing down of a flag, by persons unknown, from a building in Costa Rica on February 18, for which Yglesias demanded an apology from Zelaya.
- Born: Rattanbai Jinnah, the second wife of future Pakistan leader Muhammad Ali Jinnah and the mother of his only child, Dina Jinnah; in Bombay, British India, as Rattanbai Petit. Nicknamed "Ruttie", she would die on her 28th birthday (d. 1929)

== February 21, 1900 (Wednesday) ==
- The contract for the New York City Subway was signed between the City of New York and John B. MacDonald of the Interborough Rapid Transit Company. McDonald's company would build the subway at a cost of $35,000,000 and would have the right to operate the system for 50 years, with an option to renew for another 25 years.
- Future film director Cecil B. DeMille made his Broadway debut at the Garden Theater, Manhattan, New York City, in a production of Hearts Art Trumps.

== February 22, 1900 (Thursday) ==
- In a meeting at the Raleigh Hotel in Washington, D.C., the national committee of the Democratic Party voted 40–9 to hold its convention in Kansas City, Missouri. The city of Milwaukee, Wisconsin, had also made a bid to host the gathering. The committee also confirmed the date for the convention to open on the Fourth of July.
- The Knights of Columbus created the "Fourth Degree", with the first persons initiated in New York City.
- This is cited, erroneously, in some sources as the date that the Territory of Hawaii was created; however, as noted by the University of Hawaiʻi, the Organic Act of 1900 was passed on March 1 and became law on April 30.
- Born: Luis Buñuel, Spanish-Mexican film director, known for his surrealist films including Un Chien Andalou and That Obscure Object of Desire; in Calanda (d. 1983)

== February 23, 1900 (Friday) ==
- Senora Rafaela Ybarra de Vilallonga died at her home in Bilbao, Spain. She used her wealth to found the Holy Family Hospice and the Congregacion de los Santos Angeles Custodios (Sisters of the Holy Guardian Angels). Pope John Paul II would beatify her on September 30, 1984.

== February 24, 1900 (Saturday) ==
- Died: Poet Richard Hovey, 35, at a New York City hospital, following minor abdominal surgery. Wrote one biographer, "Few poets of the younger generation gave such promise as Hovey, and at the time of his death the outlook seemed brightest." (b. 1864)

== February 25, 1900 (Sunday) ==
- More than 150 bystanders were injured in the Paris suburb of Saint-Ouen, France, while watching a fire at a warehouse block. Six warehouses, including several that had vats of alcohol, burned down in a fire that started at 8 am. By 4 pm, the flames reached the alcohol and the first of several explosions rained debris upon the crowd.

== February 26, 1900 (Monday) ==
- Rear Admiral Otto von Diederichs met with Kaiser Wilhelm to outline, for the first time, contingency plans for a war with the United States. His proposal was for an all-out offensive on the east coast. The armored frigates SMS König Wilhelm, SMS Friedrich Carl, SMS Preussen and SMS Friedrich der Grosse would lead an attack of Siegried-class and Baden class ships against the Northeastern United States during the summer, after arriving at the West Indies in the winter.
- General Leonard Wood, military governor of Cuba, issued his Order No. 90, to establish the Guardia Rural, an internal police force composed of Cuban soldiers. The force would suppress dissent in Cuba prior to Fidel Castro's 1959 rise to power.
- The first Harvard vs. Yale ice hockey game was played in New York, with Yale winning 4–0.
- Bloomfield, New Jersey, was incorporated as a town. In 1981, it would return to being a township.
- Born: Halina Konopacka, Polish athlete, Olympic gold medalist and women's record holder for the discus throw at the 1928 Summer Olympics; in Rawa Mazowiecka (d. 1989)

== February 27, 1900 (Tuesday) ==
- At the Congregational Memorial Hall on Farringdon Road in London, 120 persons gathered to form the "Labour Representation Committee", which would later become the Labour Party, with Ramsay MacDonald as its first secretary. The Labour Committee placed two candidates in British Parliament in 1900, including Keir Hardie. In 1924, MacDonald became the first Labour prime minister. The party would attain a majority in Parliament in 1945.
- At Paardeberg, General Piet Cronjé and 3,000 Boer troops unconditionally surrendered to British General Frederick Roberts, commander of British forces in South Africa during the Second Boer War. Roberts received General Cronje at 7:00 in the morning, and granted a request for safe passage for Cronje and his family to Cape Town.
- In London, the Daily Mail, the Daily News and the Morning Post published an interview with E.S. Grogan, who reported that in his exploration of Africa, he had found "enormous lava streams, forming a veritable sea, forty miles by sixty, and a hundred feet deep", near Lake Tanganyika, and that he had encountered the Balekas, a 3,000 member tribe of cannibals.
- Bayern Munich, the most successful team in German football, was founded.

== February 28, 1900 (Wednesday) ==
- After a siege of four months during the Second Boer War, the British fortress of Ladysmith in South Africa was liberated. General Redvers Buller's dispatch the next morning was "General Dundonald, with the Natal carbineers and a composite regiment, entered Ladysmith last night. The country between me and Ladysmith is reported clear of the enemy. I am moving on Nelthorpe." On receipt of the cable, there was celebration across the British Empire. An account of the time noted that "London went literally mad with joy, and throughout England the scenes witnessed have no parallel in the memories of this generation." Lieutenant-General George White, the Natal colony commander who had led the defence of the frontier town, addressed the residents that evening, saying "Thank God we kept the flag flying." His voice breaking, he added, "It cut me to the heart ... to reduce your rations as I did." After an uncomfortable pause, he added, "I promise you, though, that I'll never do it again."
- Born: Wolf Hirth, German aircraft pilot, pioneer for gliding and designer of the sailplane, co-founder of Schempp-Hirth; in Stuttgart (d. 1959)

== February 29, 1900 (Omitted under the Gregorian calendar) ==
- Under the Julian calendar, at this time still in use in jurisdictions such as Russia, all years evenly divisible by four included February 29 as a "leap year day". However, under the Gregorian calendar, used by the majority of the world, only the centennial years that were evenly divisible by 400, such as 1600 and 2000, had leap days. Thus, for most of the world the day following February 28, 1900 was March 1, 1900.
- The New York Times noted a problem with technology of the day: "It is said on trustworthy authority that to-day calendar clocks, for the first time since their invention, will all go wrong unless their owners give them a little assistance ... this is not a leap year, for astronomers have decreed that, in order to keep the calendar in the present relation to the season, it is necessary to change the natural leap year to a common year when it falls on a century." The calendar clock, invented by William H. Akins and Joseph C. Burritt, was patented in 1854.
