= Lewis Baker (politician) =

American politician (1832–1899)

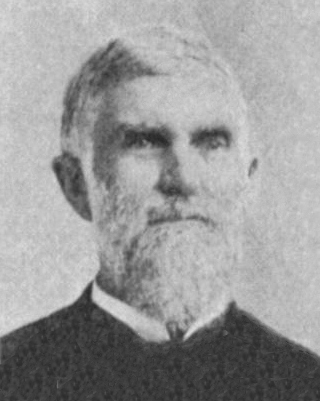

4th President of the West Virginia Senate
- In office 1871–1872
- Preceded by: Daniel D. T. Farnsworth
- Succeeded by: Carlos A. Sperry

United States Minister to Costa Rica
- In office May 20, 1893 – December 9, 1897
- President: Grover Cleveland
- Preceded by: Richard Cutts Shannon
- Succeeded by: William L. Merry

United States Minister to El Salvador
- In office May 20, 1893 – December 9, 1897
- President: Grover Cleveland
- Preceded by: Richard Cutts Shannon
- Succeeded by: William L. Merry

United States Minister to Nicaragua
- In office May 13, 1893 – December 9, 1897
- President: Grover Cleveland
- Preceded by: Richard Cutts Shannon
- Succeeded by: William L. Merry

Personal details
- Born: November 11, 1832 Belmont County, Ohio, U.S.
- Died: April 30, 1899 (aged 66) Washington, D. C., U.S.
- Resting place: Greenwood Cemetery; Wheeling, West Virginia; 40.0617°N 80.6794°W
- Party: Democratic
- Spouse: Ruth Amanda Fordyce
- Occupation: Journalist

Lewis Baker (November 11, 1832 – April 30, 1899) was the Democratic President of the West Virginia Senate from Ohio County and served from 1871 to 1872.

Lewis Baker was born in Belmont County, Ohio, in 1832. In the 1850 US Federal Census, he is listed as an apprentice printer in Perry Township, Tuscarawas County, Ohio. He was admitted to practice law in Ohio. He declined the Democratic Party nomination to congress in his twenty fifth year.

Just before the 1860 census, he married Ruth Amanda Fordyce, daughter of John Fordyce and Ruth Greg. Ruth was born August 12, 1842, in Ohio. In 1860, Lewis and Ruth were living in Cambridge in Guernsey County, Ohio. Lewis' occupation was listed as editor and publisher.

By 1870, Lewis and Ruth were living in Ohio County, West Virginia with their children John, Mary, Harry, Anna, and Jennie. Harry was born in West Virginia in 1865, dating the family's move. Lewis' occupation was listed as journalist.

On June 20, 1863, West Virginia became the 35th state in the Union. The Wheeling Custom House served as the first state house. Lewis Baker served as a state senator from 1871 to 1872. He was elected president of the Senate on January 17, 1871.

On February 1, 1885, Lewis purchased the St. Paul Globe and moved his family to Minnesota.

In 1893 Baker was appointed the United States Minister to Nicaragua, Costa Rica and El Salvador. He sailed from New York aboard the ship Costa Rico on April 29, 1893, with his daughters Anne and Virginia. They arrived in Managua on May 12, 1893, in the midst of a revolution.

Baker died in 1899 of anemia and was buried with his wife in Greenwood Cemetery in Wheeling, West Virginia.

West Virginia Senate
| Preceded by Daniel D. T. Farnsworth | President; 1871–1872 | Succeeded by Carlos A. Sperry |
Diplomatic posts
| Preceded by Richard Cutts Shannon | United States Minister to Nicaragua; May 13, 1893–December 9, 1897 | Succeeded by William L. Merry |
| Preceded by Richard Cutts Shannon | United States Minister to El Salvador; May 20, 1893–December 9, 1897 | Succeeded by William L. Merry |
| Preceded by Richard Cutts Shannon | United States Minister to Costa Rica; May 20, 1893–December 9, 1897 | Succeeded by William L. Merry |
