= January 1900 =

Month in 1900

<<	January 1900					>>
Su	Mo	Tu	We	Th	Fr	Sa
	1	2	3	4	5	6
7	8	9	10	11	12	13
14	15	16	17	18	19	20
21	22	23	24	25	26	27
28	29	30	31

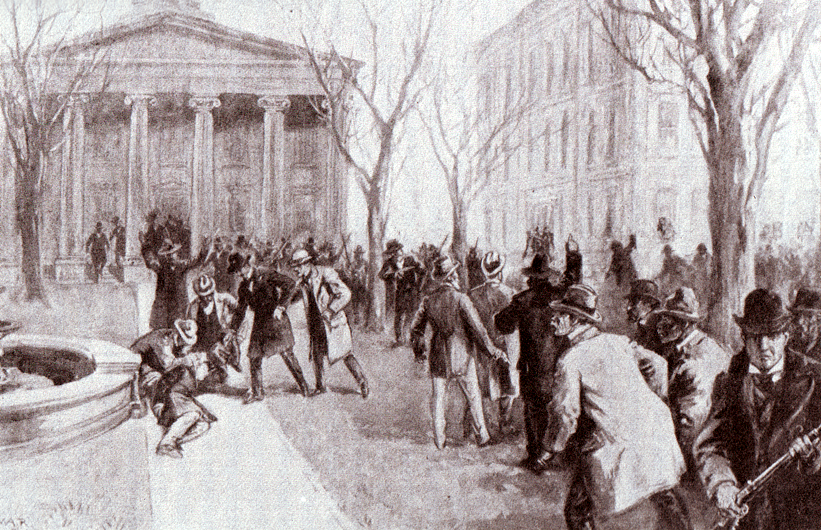
January 30, 1900: Kentucky Governor-Elect Goebel is fatally wounded by assassin, just one day before taking office. Governor Goebel dies on February 3, 1900

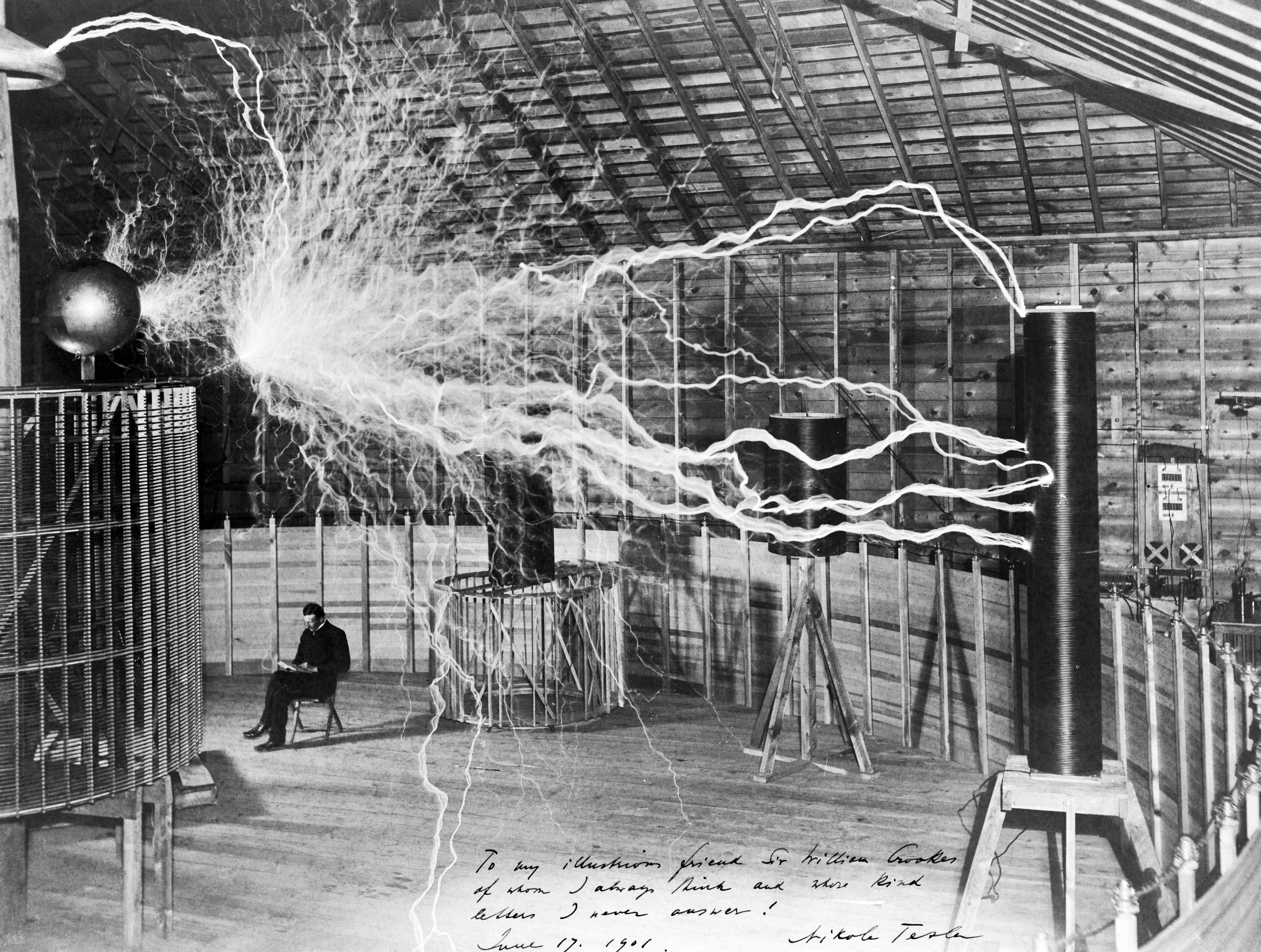
January 7, 1900: Tesla closes down his Colorado Springs laboratory

The following events occurred in January 1900:

== January 1, 1900 (Monday) ==
- The Fists of Righteous Harmony, popularly known as the "Boxers", stepped up their opposition to the foreign presence in China, killing the first foreign missionary. Reverend S.M. Brooke from the United Kingdom was kidnapped the day before while returning to his home in Tainanfu and beheaded on New Year's Day.
- Born:
  - Xavier Cugat, Spanish musician; as Francesc Xavier Cugat de Bru i Deuflofeu; in Girona, Catalonia (d. 1990)
  - Chiune Sugihara, Japanese diplomat who rescued an estimated 6,000 Lithuanian and Polish Jews from the Holocaust, Righteous Among the Nations; in Yaotsu, Gifu Prefecture (d. 1986)
  - Major General Vasily Askalepov, Soviet Red Army officer who was arrested and imprisoned from 1936 to 1937 as a major, then released and promoted in rank; later proclaimed a Hero of the Soviet Union; in Don Host Oblast, Russian Empire (d.1948)

== January 2, 1900 (Tuesday) ==
- Following a brief cabinet meeting, United States Secretary of State John Hay announced the success of negotiations with other nations to begin the Open Door Policy to promote trade with China.
- The "autostage", the first electric bus, became operational, running on Fifth Avenue in New York City. Eight people could sit inside, and four outside, and the fare was one nickel.
- Born: William Haines, American actor; in Staunton, Virginia (d. 1973)

== January 3, 1900 (Wednesday) ==
- Friedrich Weyerhäuser purchased 900,000 acres (1,405 square miles) of forestlands in Washington from railroad owner James J. Hill for $5,400,000 in advance of the founding of the Weyerhauser Timber Company.
- An insurance carrier concluded that the British transport Victoria, last seen on November 14, had been lost in a typhoon.

== January 4, 1900 (Thursday) ==
- In Manila, the largest city in the Philippines, General Elwell Otis, the highest ranking American officer, issued orders providing for the first regulations of the sale of liquor in the city. "Until January 4, 1900", wrote the Assistant Adjutant-General, "there was, strictly speaking, no liquor license law in Manila."
- An earthquake was registered in Tiflis (now Tbilisi, Georgia), killing more than 1,100 people. Ten villages, along with the town of Akhalkalaki were destroyed.

Corporate flag

Colonial flag

Current flag

- In Lagos, formal ceremonies were held to lower the flag of the Royal Niger Company and replace it with the British flag, as the United Kingdom took over administration of Nigeria.
- United States Senator Lucien Baker of Kansas announced that he would not seek re-election.
- Born: James Bond, American ornithologist; in Philadelphia. In 1953, author Ian Fleming would get Bond's permission to use the name in his 007 novels. (d. 1989)

== January 5, 1900 (Friday) ==
- In Baltimore, physicist Dr. Henry A. Rowland of Johns Hopkins University announced that he had discovered that the cause of Earth's magnetic field was its own rotation, based on experiments to produce magnetism by the rotation of a motor.
- In film, January 5, 1900, provided the opening of the 1960 George Pal production of The Time Machine, with the traveler having returned from 802,701 AD.
- Born: Yves Tanguy, French painter; in Paris (d. 1955)

== January 6, 1900 (Saturday) ==
- Battles occurred in multiple venues in Southern Africa in the Second Boer War. The German steamship Herzog was seized by the British warship HMS Thetis outside of Delagoa Bay in East Africa, on suspicions that it was carrying supplies to Boer troops. The Portuguese colonial governor of Zambesia was among the passengers. After no troop supplies were found, the ship and its crew were released on January 22.
- In the Siege of Ladysmith, Boer troops under the command of General C.J. de Villiers attempted a raid against the British fortress in South Africa. 1,000 soldiers died in its defense. British Lieutenant-General Sir George White held the defense until relief arrived on February 28. His command during the battle earned him the Order of St Michael and St George.
- For the first time in centuries, the sword of the Gorsedd bards was solemnly unsheathed at Merionethshire in Wales. According to contemporary records, "The chief bard invoked the blessing of God on British arms in South Africa, and announced that the sword would not be sheathed again till the triumph of the forces of righteousness over the hordes of evil."

== January 7, 1900 (Sunday) ==
- Melville E. Ingalls, President of the Cleveland, Cincinnati, Chicago and St. Louis Railway, known commonly as the "Big Four", reported that William Kissam Vanderbilt had taken control of that line. Vanderbilt had also taken control of the Lake Erie and Western, and the Chesapeake and Ohio railroads. Ingalls was quoted as saying, "There is no doubt that the Vanderbilts now own the 'Big Four'. As a matter of fact, they have controlled it for some time, but the practical ownership has just been secured." A meeting was held the following day, at Vanderbilt's office in Grand Central Station, of the directors of Big Four railroads.
- General A.W. Greely, polar explorer and Chief Signal Officer of the United States Army, was beaten unconscious at his home in Washington, D.C.
- Nikola Tesla closed down his laboratory in Colorado Springs, Colorado, after seven months of experiments in the long-distance transmission of energy.

== January 8, 1900 (Monday) ==
- U.S. President William McKinley added a large section of land in the Arizona Territory to the existing Navajo Indian Reservation, extending the Navajo territory westward to the edge of the Colorado River. The area includes Tuba City, Arizona (Tó Naneesdizí) and Cameron, Arizona (Naʼníʼá Hasání). President McKinley also placed Alaska under military rule, creating the Department of Alaska within the War Department, citing increased migration to the territory. Colonel George M. Randall of the 8th U.S. Infantry was set to command the new department.
- Marshal O. Waggoner, an attorney in Toledo, Ohio who had recently converted to Christianity, destroyed his library of books "consisting of the writings of infidels". "Many of the volumes were exceedingly rare. There were a large number of manuscripts and first prints not to be found in any other library in America."
- The first 27 immigrants from Okinawa arrived in Hawaii on the ship City of China, following transportation arranged by Kyuzo Toyama, and were set to begin work on a sugar plantation.

== January 9, 1900 (Tuesday) ==
- Italian football club Lazio was founded as Società Podistica Lazio, being the first football club founded in the Italian capital of Rome.
- Arthur Balfour, Conservative leader of the House of Commons of the United Kingdom, acknowledged the United Kingdom's reverses in the Second Boer War, but added, "I know of no war in which Great Britain has been engaged, except that resulting in the independence of the American colonies, which did not end triumphantly."
- The home of New York World publisher (and future prize founder) Joseph Pulitzer was destroyed in a fire that killed a governess and a friend of the family. The fire broke out at the home, located on 10 East 55th Street in New York City, at 7:30 in the morning.
- Boxer Terry McGovern defeated George Dixon in a bout for the world featherweight championship, winning a $10,000 purse.
- The town of Willard Crossroads was founded in the U.S. state of Virginia.

== January 10, 1900 (Wednesday) ==
- The first through train from Cairo to Khartoum arrived in the Sudanese city.
- Field Marshal Lord Roberts arrived at Cape Town to replace General Redvers Buller as commander of British forces in the Second Boer War. Roberts, who had left from Southampton 18 days earlier on the Dunottar Castle, was accompanied by his chief of staff, Lord Kitchener.
- The Deutschland, operated by the Hamburg America Line and promising to be the fastest passenger ship to that time, was launched from the shipyards at Stettin, Germany (now Szczecin, Poland).
- United States Secretary of War Elihu Root announced in Milwaukee that he would not accept the nomination to be William McKinley's running mate in 1900. The spot became available after the death, in 1899, of Vice President Garret Hobart.
- Kentucky Governor William S. Taylor told associates that he would not release his office, even if challenger William Goebel were to be ruled the winner of the recent state election.
- Collector F.M. Davis of Chicago was arrested after bills representing $100,000 of Confederate money were found at his mail order business on Monroe Street.

== January 11, 1900 (Thursday) ==
- Following a drought during the 1899 rainy season, famine affected more than three million people in the Central Provinces of British India. The colonial government extended the area for famine relief in response to reports.
- The New York Times reported that new cleaning machines had been placed in use at the Navy Department offices in Washington, D.C., with rubber tires and spreading brushes. The machines were operated by the women who formerly scrubbed the floor by hand.

== January 12, 1900 (Friday) ==
- Wilhelm Eppstein, an 18-year old German sailor, became the first person in Australia to die of bubonic plague. Eppstein had traveled from Gawler, South Australia to the Adelaide Hospital, arriving on January 1 "in a semi-delirious condition", and said that he had deserted from the ship Formosa after it had arrived on November 12. Following his death in quarantine, an autopsy confirmed the presence of the plague bacteria.
- Henry Ford introduced his first commercial motor vehicle, a two-seat electric-powered delivery wagon, under the name of the five-month old Detroit Automobile Company (D.A.C.), which would produce eleven other models of cars before going bankrupt in November, at the rate of two per day. "Every one of the 12 or so vehicles produced through late 1900 had its own unique set of problems," a biographer would write later, "causing rip ups, tear downs, and redos that resulted in extensive, and expensive, delays. Motor vehicles retailed to the public for $1,000 were in fact costing about $1,250 to build." Rather than departing the business after the failure of the D.A.C., Ford would spend a year at designing a new, gasoline-powered automobile, and launch the Ford Motor Company on November 30, 1901.
- The Canadian Patriotic Fund was announced by Lord Minto, the Governor General of Canada, as a way of coordinating relief for Canadian soldiers (or their dependents) who had been casualties of the Second Boer War. The fund would be incorporated by the Parliament of Canada on May 23, 1901 and would raise $339,975.63 during its existence, with charitable disbursements to 1,066 recipients.
- Born: Fuller Albright, American endocrinologist, identified two genetic illnesses, Albright's hereditary osteodystrophy and McCune–Albright syndrome; in Buffalo, New York (d. 1969)

== January 13, 1900 (Saturday) ==
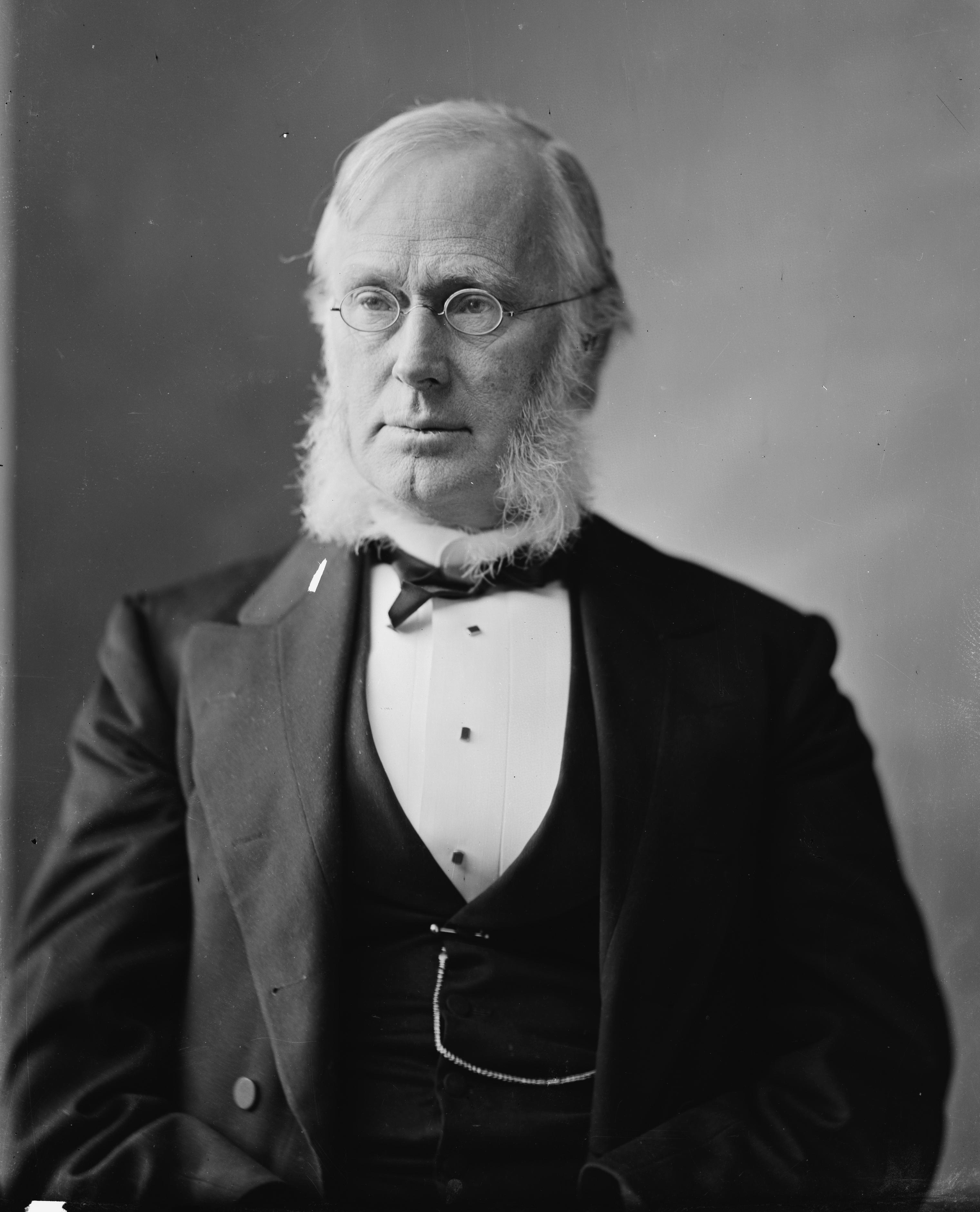
Senator Hoar

- John Barrett, formerly the U.S. Ambassador to Siam (now Thailand), said in a speech at Lake Forest College that the insurrection by Emilio Aguinaldo in the Philippines had been brought about by an anti-expansion speech made on January 9, 1899, by U.S. Senator George F. Hoar. The speech to the United States Senate had been cabled to Hong Kong at cost of $4,000. "I was in the islands, and I know that many of the Filipinos were more friendly to the Americans than to Aguinaldo and his leaders until they were incited to war by such circulars as these", Barrett said. Senator Hoar denied the accusations.
- The hospital at Johns Hopkins University began use of a small square of adhesive plaster as a tag on a baby's back, between the shoulder blades. "It holds on tightly until the time comes for the baby and its mother to leave the hospital, when the tag may be readily pulled off without causing the baby any pain", a spokesman said.

== January 14, 1900 (Sunday) ==
- The opera Tosca, composed by Giacomo Puccini, was presented for the first time, premiering at the Teatro Costanzi in Rome. Soprano Hariclea Darclée sang in the role of Floria Tosca, and tenor Emilio De Marchi appeared as her lover, Mario Cavaradossi.

== January 15, 1900 (Monday) ==
- The gigantic London Hippodrome was opened by the Moss Empires theatrical production company at Leicester Square in London's West End, at Charing Cross Road, with a grand circus as its first feature.
- The two bids for the construction of the first New York City Subway were opened at the offices of the Rapid Transit Board at City Hall, and contractor John B. McDonald's bid of $35,000,000 was the winner, coming in at less than the $39,300,000 bid by Andrew Onderdonk.
- June Ward Gayle was sworn in as a United States representative from Kentucky. He had been elected to fill a vacancy caused by the death of Evan E. Settle, who had died two months earlier.
- Born: R. B. Braithwaite, English philosopher; in Banbury, Oxfordshire (d. 1990)
- Died: G. W. Steevens, 30, British journalist, war correspondent for the Daily Mail, died of typhoid fever (b. 1869)

== January 16, 1900 (Tuesday) ==
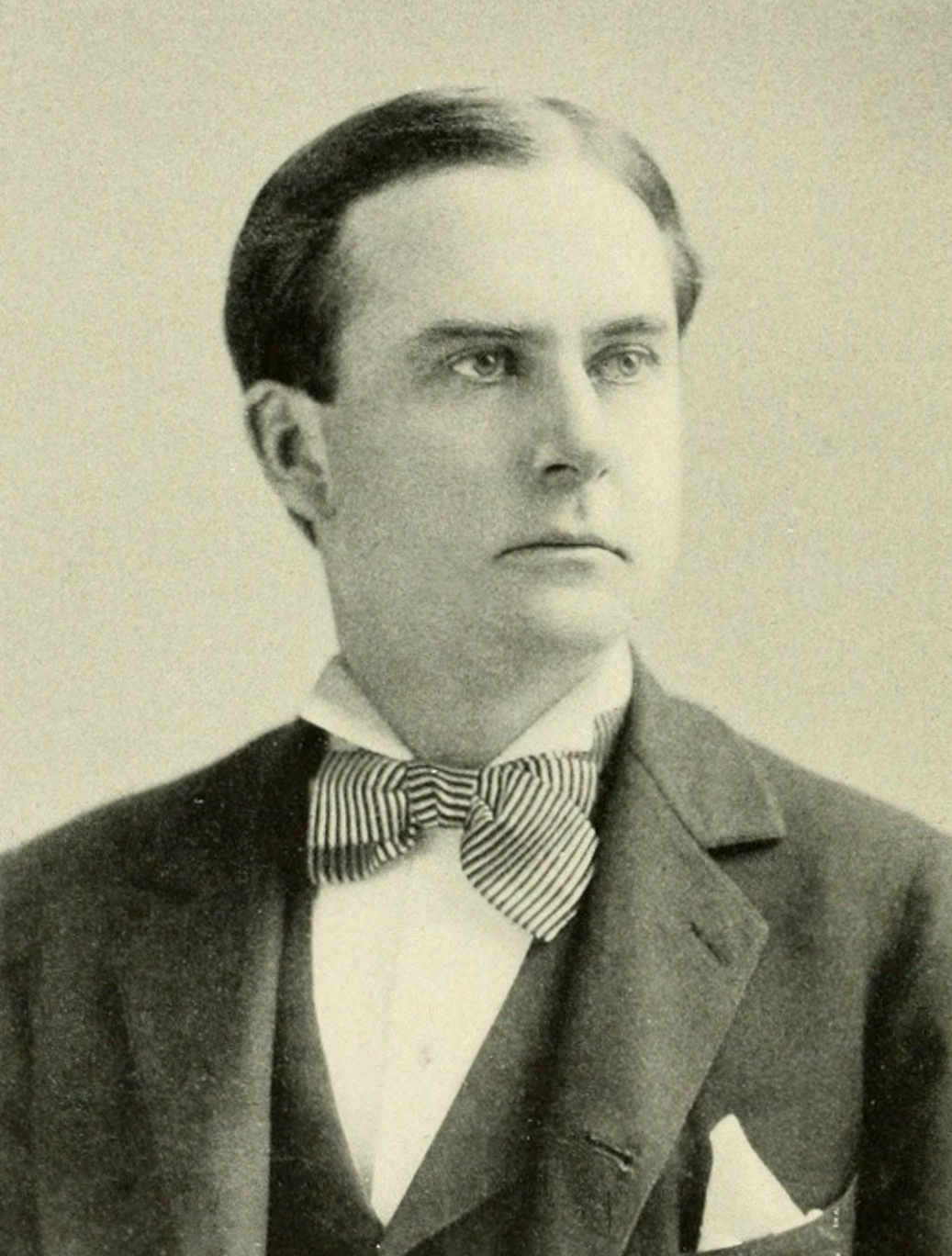
Colson

- At the Capitol Hotel in Frankfort, Kentucky, former U. S. Congressman David G. Colson shot six people, killing three of them. Colson was arrested and charged with murder.
- In executive session, the United States Senate ratified the Anglo-German treaty of 1899, in which the United Kingdom renounced its claims to the Samoan Islands.
- General Arcadio Maxílom, the leader of the Philippine resistance to American occupiers on the island of Cebu, reorganized his armies for a strategy of guerrilla warfare.
- Born: Edith Frank, German-born Dutch mother of Anne Frank; as Edith Holländer in Aachen (d. 1945)

== January 17, 1900 (Wednesday) ==
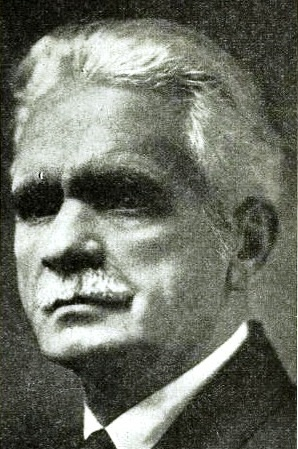
Roberts

- Brigham H. Roberts was refused a seat in the United States House of Representatives after an investigation showed that he had committed polygamy. He had married his first wife in 1878, a second wife in 1878, and a third in 1897. The vote of a committee was seven to two against seating him, with Congress members DeArmond and Littlefield arguing that he should be seated and then expelled. On January 25, the full House would vote, 268–50, to remove Roberts from United States Congress.
- After Missouri Attorney General Edward Coke Crow had announced plans to seek an injunction against its completion, the Chicago Canal was opened in a hastily prepared ceremony. Governor John Riley Tanner of Illinois signed a permit at 10:15 am, and Colonel Isaac Taylor of the Canal Commission made a five-minute speech about the importance of connecting the Great Lakes with the Mississippi River. At 11:16 am, the dam between the canal and the Des Plaines River was lowered.
- The Yaqui Indians of the state of Sonora issued a proclamation of their independence from Mexico, and asked Americans to come to their aid. The declaration, made at Bavispe, was signed by Manuel Suuveda, who declared himself President of the Yaqui state. The Mexican consul in El Paso, Texas, Francisco Mallen, described the claims of the Yaquis as "simply ridiculous". Days later, the Mexican Army suppressed the rebellion, killing 200 people and injuring 500 in Nogales.
- The superintendent of immigration in Toronto reported that nearly 14,000 Americans, with a total worth of two million dollars, emigrated to Canada during 1899, and added that "Kansas and Arkansas supplied the greater part of those who came."

== January 18, 1900 (Thursday) ==
- The Battle of Mazocoba was fought during the Yaqui Wars between Mexican government troops and the indigenous Yaqui Indians, 400 of the Yaqui were killed. Another 1,800 of the defeated people were captured, of whom half died during a forced march. The Mexican Army suffered 56 deaths and 104 wounded.
- The Weyerhauser Timber Company was incorporated in Washington.
- The Delaware Supreme Court refused to admit a prominent Philadelphia attorney, Carrie B. Kilgore, into the practice of law in that state. Although there was no direct ban against female attorneys in Delaware, Kilgore was indirectly barred by the state's provision that an attorney had to be "eligible to vote" in an election.
- Author L. Frank Baum and illustrator W. W. Denslow jointly copyrighted their new book, The Land of Oz, after receiving an advance of $500 apiece from the George M. Hill Company. The Hill company had rejected their original title, The Emerald City and (on November 17) had given the upcoming publication the working title of From Kansas to Fairyland, before allowing the creators to use the Oz name in the title. The book would be released on May 17 under the title The Wonderful Wizard of Oz.

== January 19, 1900 (Friday) ==
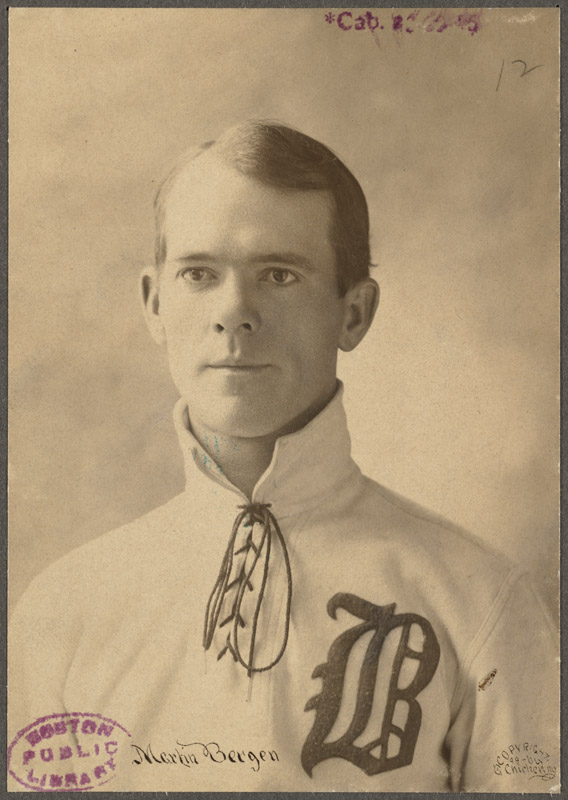
Bergen

- In North Brookfield, Massachusetts, catcher Marty Bergen of the Boston Beaneaters (later, the Atlanta Braves) murdered his wife, his six-year-old daughter and his three-year-old son, with an axe, then killed himself by slitting his throat. Bergen had been one of the best catchers in the National League and had been a major factor in Boston's pennant wins in 1897 and 1898, but had suffered from emotional problems and had become increasingly erratic after the death of his son in April 1899; he apparently became violent after learning that he was going to be traded to the New York Giants during the offseason.
- Eight days after bubonic plague had been diagnosed on the western side of the Australian continent, a new case was discovered on its eastern coast at the Prince Albert Hospital in Sydney. While working at the wharves in Sydney Harbour, Arthur Paine, a 33-year-old delivery truck driver, had been bitten by a flea carrying the Yersinia pestis bacteria.
- At Alaminos, Laguna in the Philippines, Filipino guerrillas captured a train carrying American soldiers.
- Born: William V. Houston, American physicist, author of Principles of Quantum Mechanics (McGraw-Hill, 1951) and Principles of Mathematical Physics (McGraw-Hill, 1934), second President of Rice University; in Mount Gilead, Ohio (d. 1968)

== January 20, 1900 (Saturday) ==
- At the request of Grand Admiral Alfred von Tirpitz, the director of the German Imperial Naval Office, Admiral Otto von Diederichs presented contingency plans for a naval blockade and an armed invasion of the United States. The recommendation of Diederichs was "Die Erwerbung werthvoller Küstenstadte der Neuenglandstaaten wäre das wirksamste mittel, den frieden zu erzwingen" ("The acquisition of valuable coastal towns of New England states would be the most effective medium to enforce peace.") He also advised that the German naval fleet would need to be doubled, to 38 line ships, 12 large cruisers and 32 small cruisers.
- George and Edward Meeks, murderers of Leopold Edlinger, were taken from Bates County Jail in Fort Scott, Kansas, and lynched by a mob of 500.
- Died: British philosopher John Ruskin, 80, whose writings influenced the Victorian era, died from influenza during an epidemic in London (b. 1819)

== January 21, 1900 (Sunday) ==
- Mrs. Annie Ellsworth Smith, 73, the original operator on the Baltimore–Washington telegraph line, passed away. As press reports would note the next day, "It was Mrs. Smith who, on May 24, 1844, when she was a girl of seventeen, sent the famous first telegraphic message, 'What hath God wrought?' from the United States Supreme Courtroom in Washington, D.C., to Baltimore."
- Willard Erastus Christianson, a/k/a Matt Warner, a former member of Butch Cassidy's Wild Bunch gang and a legendary gunfighter, was released from jail after being pardoned by Utah's Governor. After his release, he "dedicated the rest of his life to the straight and narrow" and would later be elected as a justice of the peace and would serve as a deputy sheriff in Carbon County.
- Born:
  - Anselm Franz, Austrian-born German engineer, designer of the first turbojet engine for Nazi Germany; in Schladming (d. 1994)
  - Charles Moses, British-born Australian broadcaster, first general manager of the Australian Broadcasting Commission who oversaw the introduction of network radio and television to Australia; in Little Hulton, Lancashire, England (d. 1988)
  - Bernhard Rensch, German evolutionary biologist; in Thale (d. 1990)
  - Henry Somerset, Baron Herbert, British noble, Master of the Horse for the British royal family from 1936 to 1978; in Badminton, Gloucestershire (d. 1984)
- Died:
  - David Edward Hughes, 68, British inventor who created the first practical electrical microphone in 1878 (b. 1831)
  - John "Liver-Eating" Johnson, 75, mountain man of the American Old West who was said to have killed 300 Crow Indians and eaten their livers to avenge the murder of his wife in 1847 (b. 1824)
  - Francis, Duke of Teck, 62, British noble, father of Mary of Teck who later became the Queen Consort of George V (b. 1837)

== January 22, 1900 (Monday) ==
- The Library of Congress officially opened its newspaper reading room, the largest in the world at that time.
- Henry Allen Hazen, the chief forecaster for the United States Weather Bureau (now the National Weather Service), was fatally injured when his bike collided with an African-American pedestrian at the corner of 16th and M streets in Washington, D.C. He would die the following day from a skull fracture. Hazen was credited with inventing the sling psychrometer, an improved thermometer shelter, and detailed barometric tables.

== January 23, 1900 (Tuesday) ==
- Thirty thousand Austrian miners went on strike, joining 40,000 who had already walked out. The miners sought guarantees of an eight-hour day and higher wages.
- Born: William Ifor Jones, Welsh conductor; in Merthyr Tydfil, Glamorganshire (d. 1988)

== January 24, 1900 (Wednesday) ==
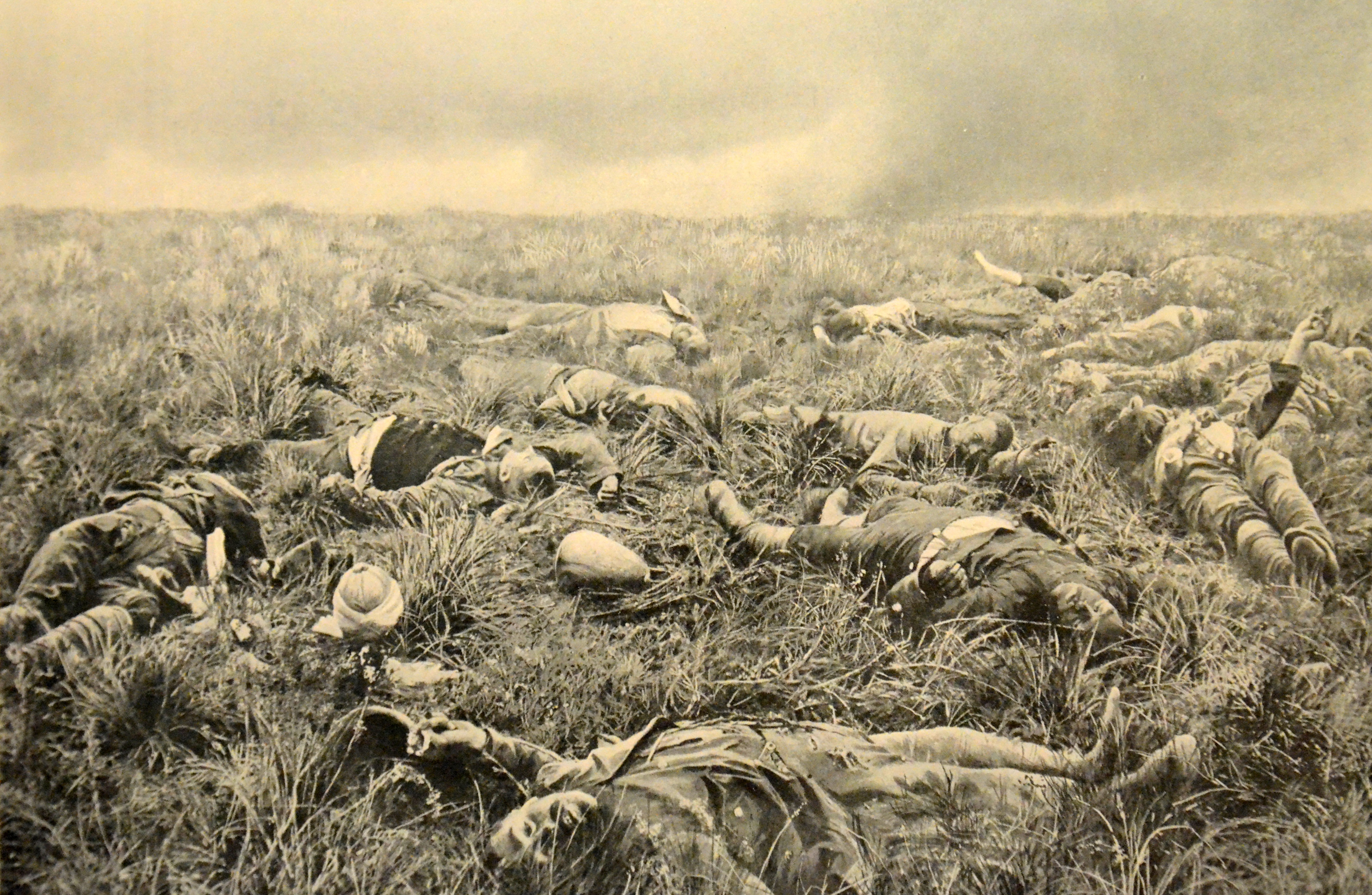
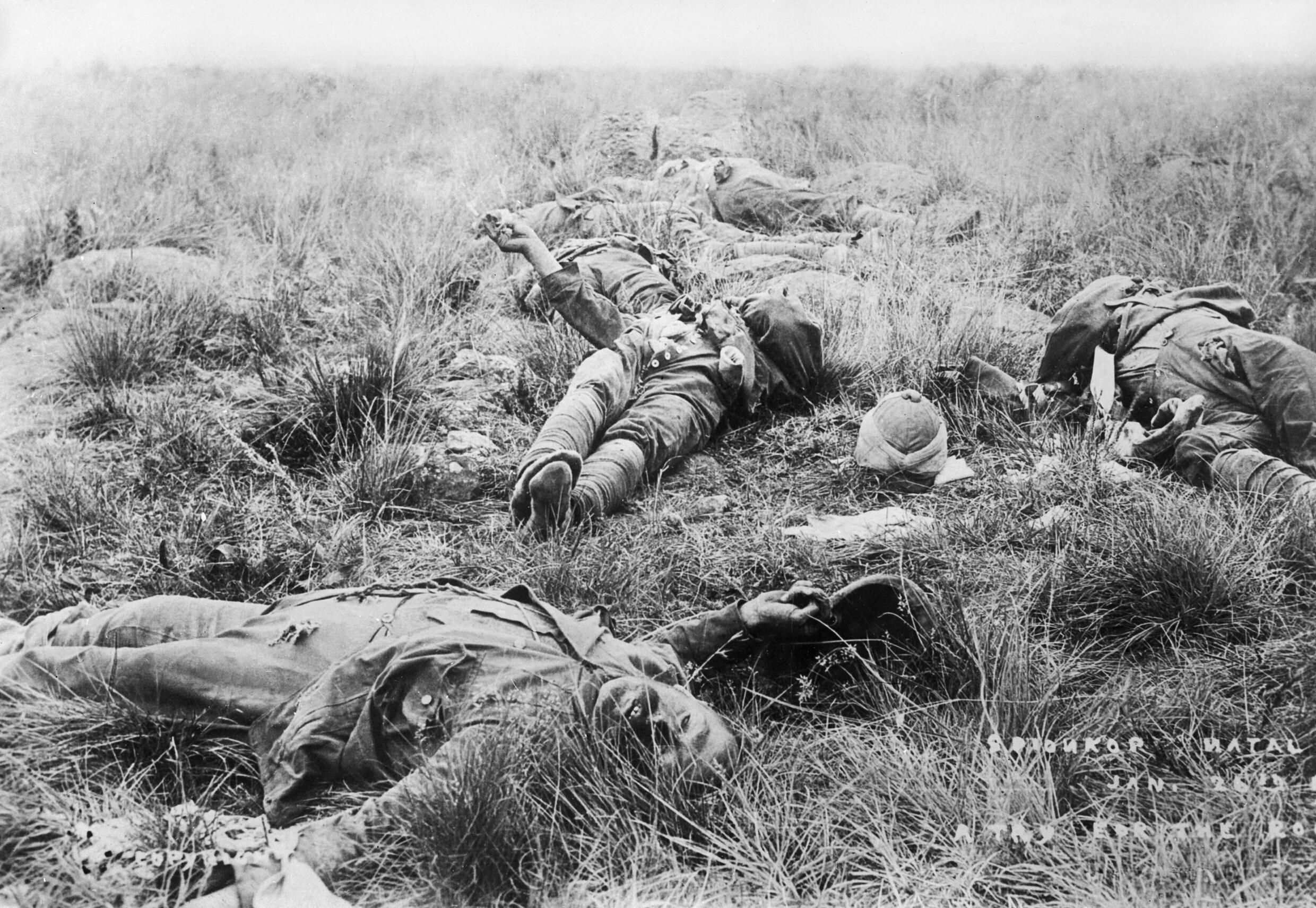
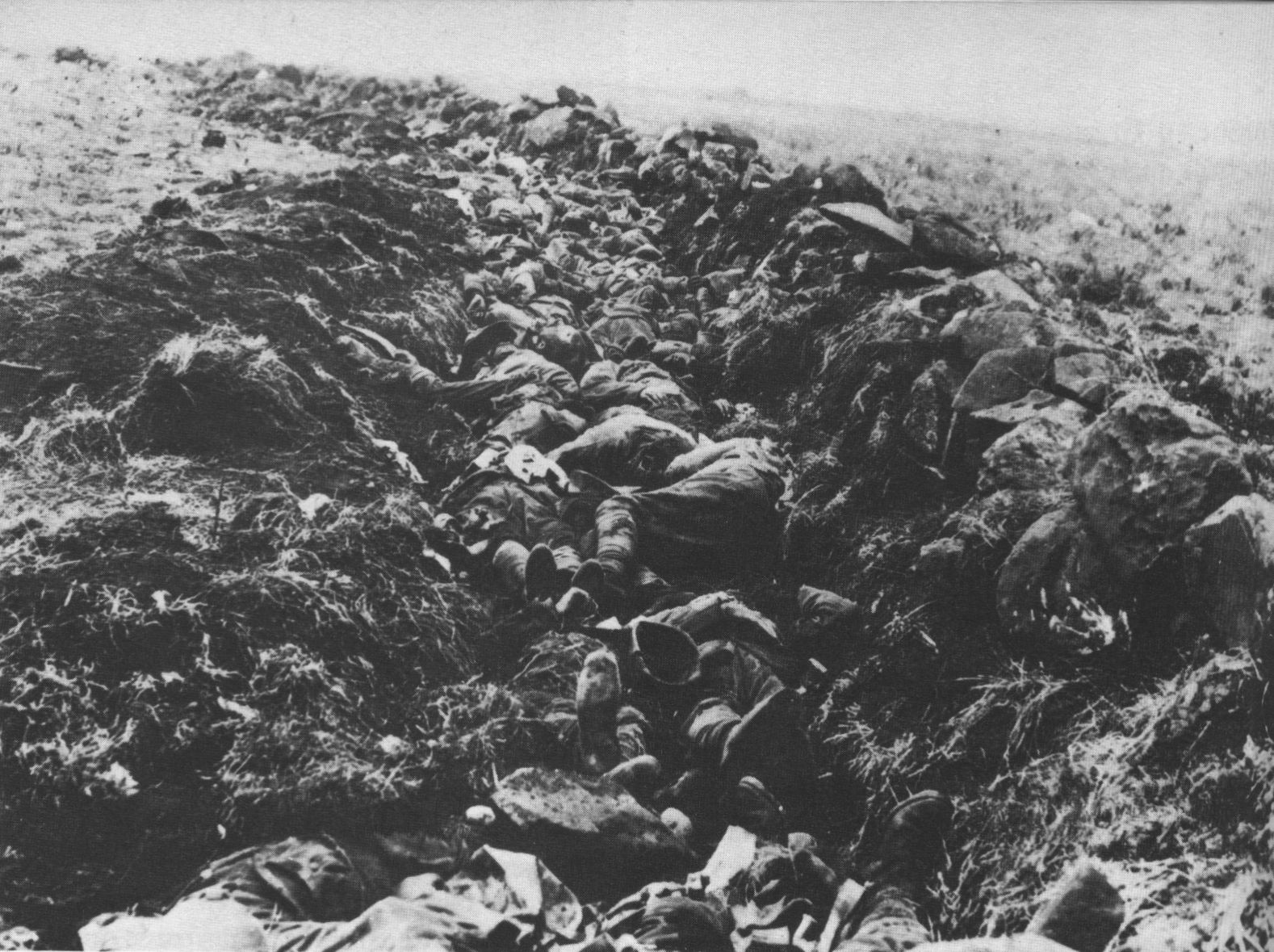
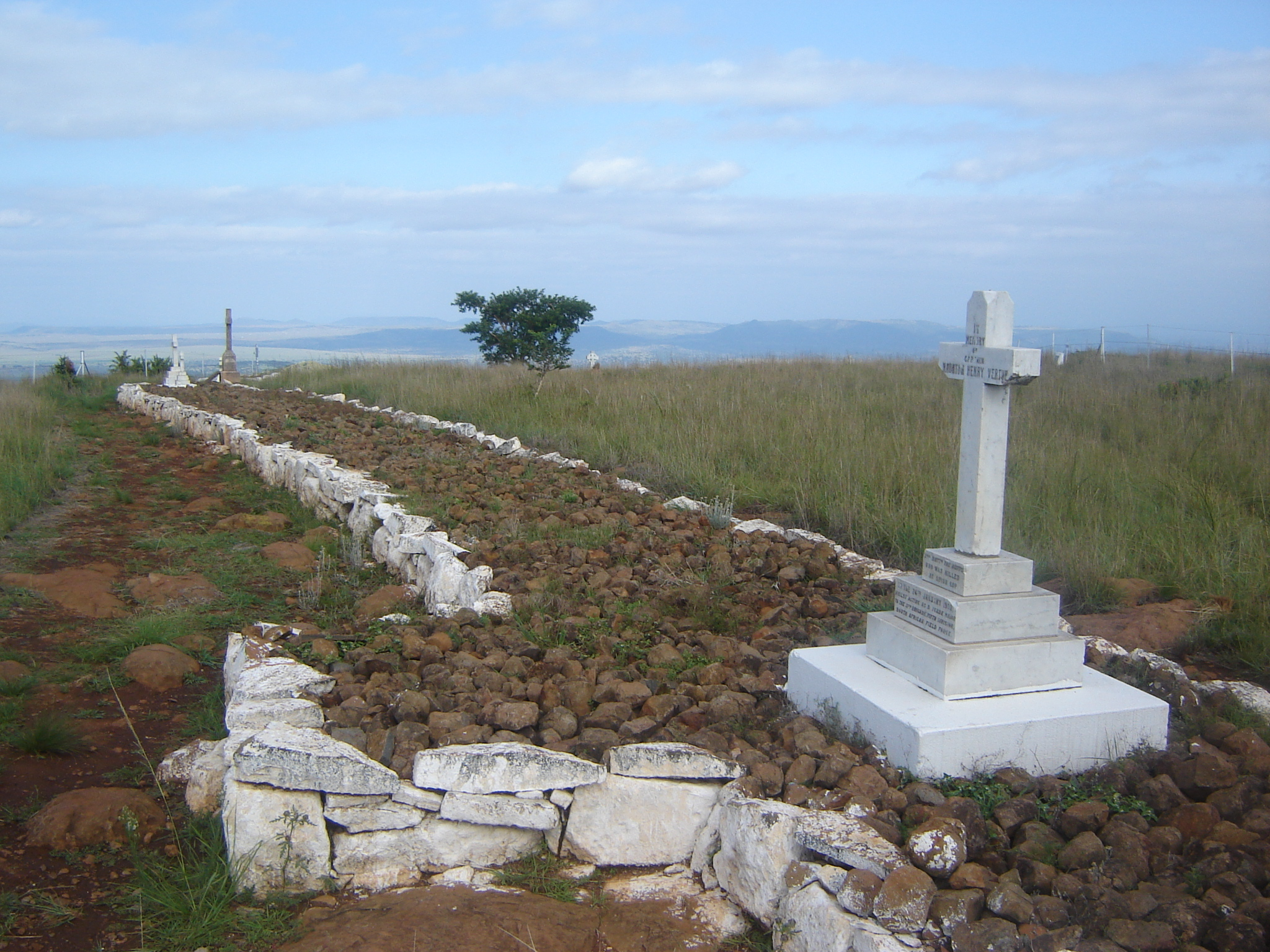
January 24, 1900: Three pictures of British casualties after the Battle of Spion Kop. The last picture shows the grave marker above the trenches where the British casualties are buried.
- At a closed session in Beijing, a council of "Grand Councillors, Grand Secretaries and Presidents of the Board" was convened, and agreed that the Guangxu Emperor should abdicate. P'u Ch'un, age 14, was announced as heir apparent to the throne.
- At the Battle of Spion Kop in the Second Boer War, the 8,000 Boer troops, under the command of General Louis Botha, defeated a 25,000-man British contingent, led by Sir Charles Warren. General Redvers Buller cabled to London that "Gen. Warren's garrison, I am sorry to say, I find this morning, had in the night abandoned Spion Kop." Because the slope below Spion Kop was too steep, artillery could not be taken up the hill by either side, and the battle was waged entirely by riflemen. The British reportedly had 243 dead and 1,250 wounded, along with about 300 men captured by the Boers, but the Boers' victory came at a cost of 335 total casualties, including 68 killed and 267 wounded.

== January 25, 1900 (Thursday) ==
- To combat an outbreak of bubonic plague, health authorities arranged the burning of a condemned home in Honolulu. The fire got out of control and destroyed a large portion of the city at its Chinatown section, leaving 6,000 people homeless.
- Born: Theodosius Dobzhansky, Ukrainian biologist, pioneering researcher into genetics and evolutionary biology, author of Genetics and the Origin of Species; in Nemyriv, Malorossiya, Russian Empire (d. 1975)

== January 26, 1900 (Friday) ==
- Following the announcement of the abdication of Emperor Kwang Hsu, the Director of the Imperial Chinese Telegraph in Shanghai obtained a petition with 1,230 signatures and sent a telegram to urge that the Emperor reconsider. Empress Dowager Cixi ordered his arrest, but the Director escaped to Macao.
- Admiral Hubert von Rebeur-Paschwitz sent a lengthy memorandum to Grand Admiral Alfred von Tirpitz on the proposed German invasion of the United States, noting that "An occupation of the nominal capital, Washington, would accomplish nothing, since there is no important commerce nor industry there." He recommended instead that the German fleet invade the "Nordosten gelegenen Handels- und Industriecentren" ("the northeastern trade and industry centers") and recommended a "Stützpunkt" (base of operations) at Provincetown, Massachusetts.
- Born: Karl Ristenpart, German conductor, known for his collaborations with of the Chamber Orchestra of the Saar; in Kiel (d. 1967)

== January 27, 1900 (Saturday) ==
- In Peiping (now Beijing), diplomats for the United Kingdom, the United States, France, Germany and Italy sent notes to the Chinese Foreign Ministry (the Zongli Yamen) requesting an imperial decree to order the suppression of the Boxers and the Big Swords Society in Shandong and Zhili.
- Despite U.S. President William McKinley's executive order that the new American territory be called "Puerto Rico", a Senate Committee voted unanimously to refer to the island legally as "Porto Rico". In addition, the U.S. Treasurer was authorized to retire the Puerto Rican money in favor of U.S. coinage, at the rate of 60 cents per peso.
- Born: U.S. Navy Admiral Hyman G. Rickover, Polish-born American naval officer, first director of the U.S. Naval Nuclear Propulsion Program, known as the "Father of the Nuclear Navy"; as Chaim Godalia Rickover in Maków Mazowiecki, Poland (d. 1986)

== January 28, 1900 (Sunday) ==
- At the restaurant "Zum Mariengarten", in Leipzig, representatives from 86 football associations met at the invitation of Theoder Schoffler, to organize the German Football Association. A limestone plaque at the Friedrich Hofmeister Verlag on Buttnerstrasse commemorates the occasion.
- In Baltimore, Police Marshal Hamilton enforced Maryland's 177-year-old blue law, Article XXVII, section 247, which provided that "No person shall work or do any bodily labor on the Lord's Day". Every store in the city was ordered closed, including businesses that formerly had arranged open. The New York Times reported that "every cigar store, corner grocery, bakery and the like were closed up tight" and that the police were ordered to take the names of violators for future prosecution.

== January 29, 1900 (Monday) ==
- The American League of Professional Baseball Clubs was organized in Philadelphia, with representatives from Boston, Philadelphia, Baltimore, Chicago, Detroit, Milwaukee and St. Louis. An eighth club was expected to be placed in New York City. During its first season, it would build its playing rosters by acquiring the minor Western League, which would play in 1900 as the American League after moving its Saint Paul, Grand Rapids and Kansas City franchises to Chicago, Cleveland and Washington, D.C.

== January 30, 1900 (Tuesday) ==
- William Goebel, who had run for Governor of Kentucky against William S. Taylor and who had taken a court challenge over the results, was found to be the winner of the recent state election. As he and his bodyguards, Colonel Jack Chinn and Warden E. P. Lillard of the state penitentiary, walked to the Kentucky Senate chamber, he was hit by gunfire that came from the neighboring state office building. Goebel attempted to draw his own revolver but collapsed on the pavement. Chinn said later that Goebel told him, "They have got me this time. I guess they have killed me." It was determined that the shots were from a .38 caliber rifle.
- Born: Martita Hunt, Argentine-born British actress; in Buenos Aires (d. 1969)

== January 31, 1900 (Wednesday) ==
- On his deathbed, William Goebel was sworn in as Governor of Kentucky at 8:55 pm. Chief Justice J.H. Hazelrigg also swore in J. C. W. Beckham as lieutenant governor. Meanwhile, William S. Taylor continued to assert that he was Governor, and issued an order moving the state legislature to meet in London, Kentucky.
- John Sholto Douglas, the Marquess of Queensberry, died at the age of 55. He had successfully pushed for the 1867 adoption of rules for boxing that still apply and that bear his name, although they were actually authored by John Graham Chambers.
