= John Shanes =

Soldier in the American Civil War

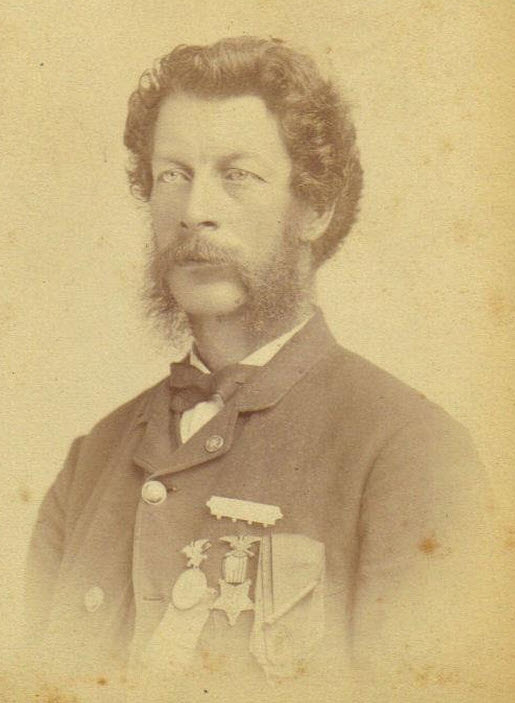
- John Shanes wearing his Medal of Honor, c. 1900
- Born: July 23, 1844; Monongalia County, West Virginia
- Died: January 26, 1904 (aged 59); Brave, Pennsylvania
- Burial place: Lantz Cemetery, Brave, Pennsylvania
- Military career
- Allegiance: United States
- Branch: United States Army; Union Army
- Service years: 1862 - 1865
- Rank: Private
- Unit: 14th West Virginia Infantry
- Conflicts: American Civil War • Battle of Rutherford's Farm
- Awards: Medal of Honor

John Shanes (July 23, 1844 – January 26, 1904) was a Union Army soldier during the American Civil War. He received the Medal of Honor for gallantry during the Battle of Rutherford's Farm near Winchester, Virginia on July 20, 1864.

== Medal of Honor citation ==
"The President of the United States of America, in the name of Congress, takes pleasure in presenting the Medal of Honor to Private John Shanes, United States Army, for extraordinary heroism on 20 July 1864, while serving with Company K, 14th West Virginia Infantry, in action at Carter's Farm, Virginia. Private Shanes charged upon a Confederate field piece in advance of his comrades and by his individual exertions silenced the piece."

== See also ==
- List of Medal of Honor recipients
- List of American Civil War Medal of Honor recipients: Q–S
