= Battle of Rutherford's Farm =

Battle of the American Civil War

Coordinates: 39°13′9.6″N 78°8′0″W

- Part of the American Civil War
Date	July 20, 1864
Location	Frederick County, near Winchester, Virginia
Result	Union victory

Belligerents
United States (Union)	(Confederate States of America) Confederate States (Confederacy)

Commanders and leaders
William W. Averell	Stephen D. Ramseur

Strength
2,350	3,300

Casualties and losses
220 total 36 killed 184 wounded	450 total 200 killed and wounded 250 prisoners
- Location of the battle in Virginia

The Battle of Rutherford's Farm, also known as Carter's Farm and Stephenson's Depot, was a small engagement between Confederate forces under Maj. Gen. Stephen D. Ramseur and Union forces under Brig. Gen. William W. Averell on July 20, 1864, in Frederick County, Virginia, during the American Civil War, as part of Confederate Lt. Gen. Jubal Early's Valley Campaign, resulting in a Union victory.

Pvt. John Shanes, Company K, 14th West Virginia Infantry, received the Medal of Honor for his actions in the fighting near Carter's Farm, where he, "charged upon a Confederate fieldpiece in advance of his comrades and by his individual exertions silenced the piece."

== Background ==
Following two unsuccessful Union attacks on his flanks at Kabletown and Berry's Ferry, General Early ordered a withdrawal from the Confederate position at Berryville towards a more secure position at Strasburg on July 19. The movement required the evacuation of the military hospitals and storage depots from the Confederate base of operations at Winchester. To cover the evacuation, Early ordered Ramseur's division to Winchester, with orders to stay within the city's defensive works and not to precipitate any unnecessary engagements with the enemy.

Three days prior, Union Maj. Gen. David Hunter had received an erroneous report of Confederate cavalry in Winchester preparing for a raid on the Baltimore and Ohio Railroad. To meet this threat, Hunter dispatched Averell's division from Martinsburg. Averell got underway on July 19 and crept slowly up the valley, wary of being overrun by Early's army, making it as far as Bunker Hill by nightfall, where he made camp.

== Battle ==
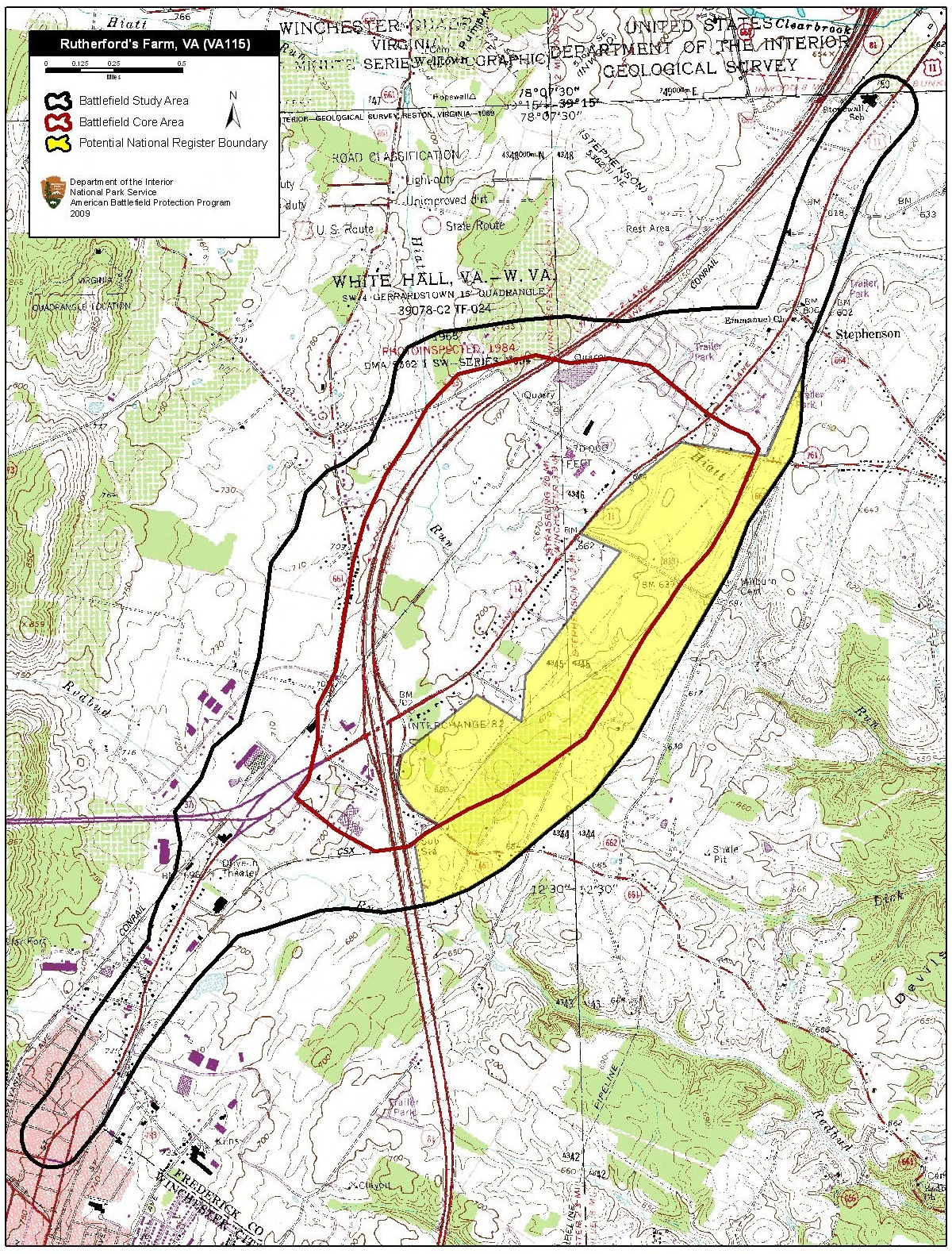
Map of Rutherford's Farm Battlefield core and study areas by the American Battlefield Protection Program.

Ramseur's division arrived at Winchester the morning of July 20, whereupon he dispatched his cavalry under John C. Vaughn and William L. Jackson to Carter's Farm north of town to scout the enemy's position. Confederate skirmishers found the Union encampment at Bunker Hill about 7 a.m. and reported their presence to Ramseur. At 9 a.m., Averell's force broke camp and set down the Valley Turnpike, fighting the Confederate skirmishers the entire way. By 11 a.m., the Federals arrived at Stephenson's Depot where they encountered Vaughn's and Jackson's dismounted cavalry supported by artillery on a small ridge. The artillery opened fire halting the Union advance and prompting Averell to bring up his artillery, leading to a protracted duel.

About 2 p.m., Vaughn sent a courier to Ramseur apprising him of the developments and recommending that the infantry be brought up to ambush the Union force. Despite Early's orders to stay within the defenses of Winchester, Ramseur saw the chance for a great victory and agreed with Vaughn, dispatching his infantry to the developing battle. Within the hour the infantry arrived and was concealed in a woods atop the ridge. As the Confederate infantry was arriving, the Union assault got underway. As the Union charge approached the woods, the concealed Confederate infantry unleashed a volley of musket fire that checked the Union advance and threatened to turn its left.

Unfortunately for the Confederates, the woods in which they hid formed an acute angle with the Turnpike, leaving their left protruding towards the Union advance. Union cavalry covering the Union right soon smashed into the exposed Confederate left flank, turning it. The Confederate center and right continued to deliver devastating fire against the Union center and left, but slowly regiment by regiment of the Confederate left began to turn in full retreat towards Winchester until finally the whole Confederate line collapsed in retreat. Despite Ramseur's effort, the line could not be reassembled before it reached the defenses of Winchester. Still unsure of the whereabouts of the rest of Early's army, Averell declined to pursue the retreating Confederates, thus ending the battle.

== Aftermath ==
The battle resulted in a resounding Union victory, but strategically resulted in little else except some much needed boosting of Union morale after a string of defeats by Early's veteran troops. The evacuation of Winchester continued undisturbed, and Ramseur, despite his insubordination resulting in unnecessary losses, received nothing more than stern talk from Early.

Pvt. John Shanes, Company K, 14th West Virginia Infantry, received the Medal of Honor for his actions in the fighting near Carter's Farm, where he "charged upon a Confederate fieldpiece in advance of his comrades and by his individual exertions silenced the piece."

The site of the battlefield has recently seen heavy development. Located on the north end of Winchester, Virginia the battlefield now hosts a shopping center and office complex.
