= December 1899 =

Month in 1899

| << | December 1899 | | | | | >> |
| Su | Mo | Tu | We | Th | Fr | Sa |
| | | | | | 1 | 2 |
| 3 | 4 | 5 | 6 | 7 | 8 | 9 |
| 10 | 11 | 12 | 13 | 14 | 15 | 16 |
| 17 | 18 | 19 | 20 | 21 | 22 | 23 |
| 24 | 25 | 26 | 27 | 28 | 29 | 30 |
| 31 |

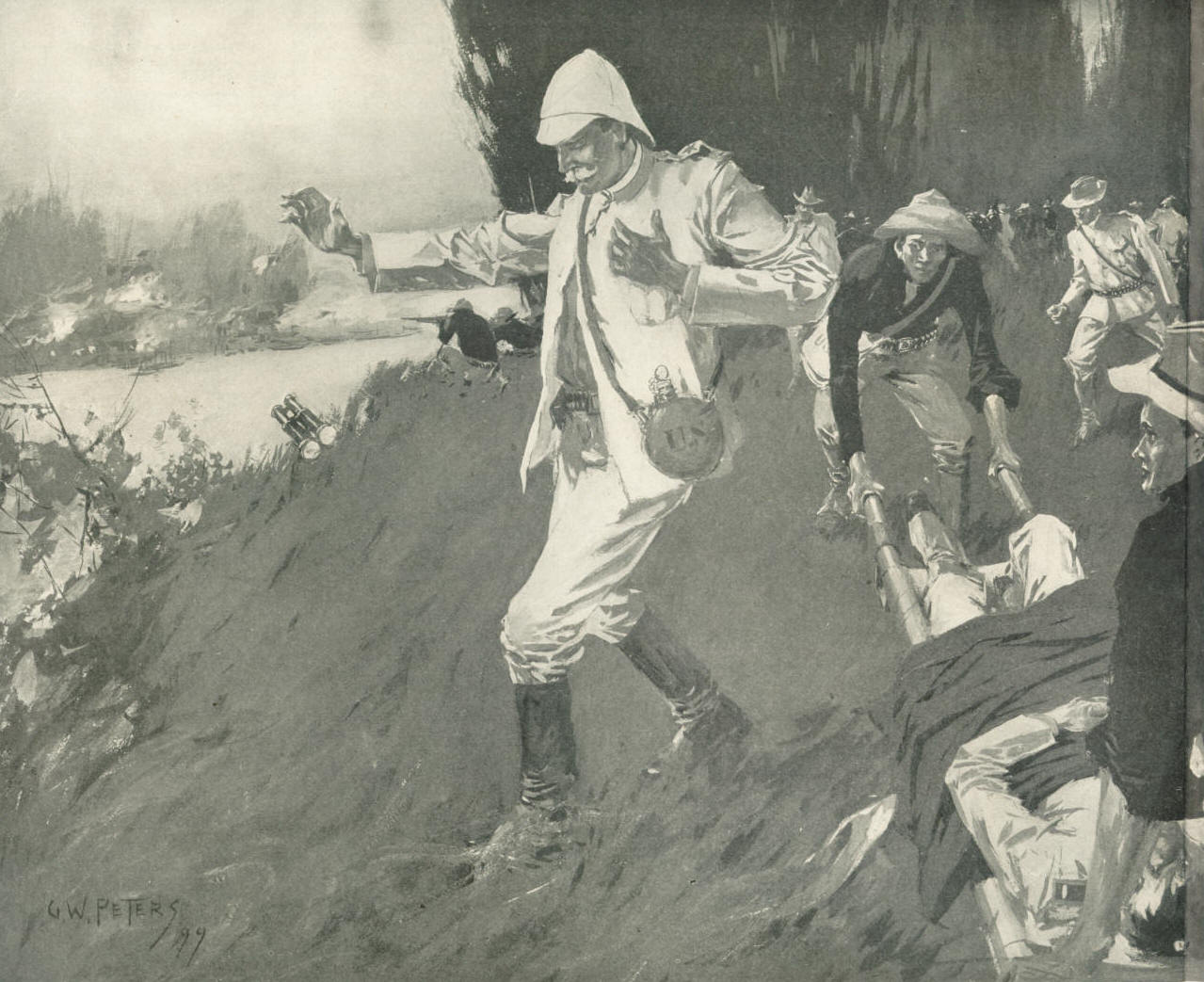
December 19, 1899: Death of U.S. Army General Henry Ware Lawton at the Battle of San Mateo

The following events occurred in December 1899:

== December 1, 1899 (Friday) ==
- Philippe Waked was granted a British patent for the first working Arabic-alphabet typewriter. Waked's patent came three months after Selim Shibli Haddad, a Syrian artist and inventor, had been granted a patent in another nation for a similar typewriter.
- Anderson Dawson of the new Australian Labor Party (ALP) formed a government as the Premier of Queensland, a self-governing colony that would join other colonies in forming the Commonwealth of Australia in 1901. Dawson's government is said by one historian to be not only the first ALP government in Australia, but also the first parliamentary labour party government anywhere in the world. Dawson's ministry collapsed after only six days.
- Born: Tommy Lucchese (born Gaetano Lucchese), Italian-American gangster, boss of the Lucchese crime family; in Palermo, Sicily (d. 1967)
- Died: Ed Gastfield, 34, American professional baseball player

== December 2, 1899 (Saturday) ==
- Philippine–American War – Battle of Tirad Pass ("The Filipino Thermopylae"): General Gregorio del Pilar and his troops guarded the retreat of Philippine President Emilio Aguinaldo before being wiped out.
- During the new moon, a near-grand conjunction of the classical planets and several binocular Solar System bodies occurred. The Sun, Moon, Mercury, Mars and Saturn were all within 15° of each other, with Venus 5° ahead of this conjunction and Jupiter 15° behind. Accompanying the classical planets in this grand conjunction were Uranus (technically visible unaided in pollution-free skies), Ceres and Pallas.
- Rebel Venezuelan General José Manuel Hernández captured the city of Maracaibo in his revolt against Cipriano Castro's government but would only be able to hold it for 16 days.
- Born:
  - John Barbirolli (born Giovanni Battista Barbirolli), English conductor; in London (d. 1970)
  - Ray Morehart, American Major League Baseball player; in Terrell, Texas (d. 1989)
- Died: Gregorio del Pilar, 24, Filipino general, was killed in action.

== December 3, 1899 (Sunday) ==
- American Telephone & Telegraph (AT&T) purchased American Bell Company and became the parent of the Bell System, which would have a monopoly on telephone communication in the U.S. for the next 75 years until competition was allowed.
- Born: Hayato Ikeda, Prime Minister of Japan; in Takehara, Hiroshima (d. 1965)

== December 4, 1899 (Monday) ==
- At the first session of the 56th U.S. Congress, David B. Henderson (Republican-Iowa) was elected Speaker of the House. The House refused permission for B. H. Roberts (Democrat-Utah) to take the oath of office as a U.S. representative, pending investigation of allegations of bigamy.
- Born: Sam Newfield (born Samuel Neufeld), American director of over 250 feature films; in New York City (d. 1964)
- Died: John Simson Woolson, 58, United States district judge for Iowa

== December 5, 1899 (Tuesday) ==
- Germany's cabinet agreed to repeal a Prussian law that had prohibited the creation of political societies or clubs.
- Died:
  - Monroe Hayward, 58, American politician, United States Senator-elect from Nebraska
  - Sir Henry Tate, 1st Baronet, 80, English sugar merchant and philanthropist, founder of the Tate Galleries

== December 6, 1899 (Wednesday) ==
- A lynch mob in Maysville, Kentucky, forced its way into the county jail to seize an African-American indicted for murder, tortured him and then burned him to death.

== December 7, 1899 (Thursday) ==
- In Reading, Pennsylvania, a fire at the Nolde Hoist Company's hosiery plant killed one woman and injured 57 women and girls.
- Died: Henry Hayes Lockwood, 85, Union Army Brigadier General and instructor at the United States Naval Academy

== December 8, 1899 (Friday) ==
- FC Barcelona, one of the most successful soccer football teams in Spain, played its first match, the English Colony Team, at the velodrome in Bonanova.
- The U.S. government took formal possession of the island of Basilan in the Philippines.
- Born: John Qualen, Canadian-American character actor (The Grapes of Wrath, His Girl Friday, Casablanca); in Vancouver, British Columbia (d. 1987)
- Died:
  - Eleazer Foster, 58, American lawyer and judge, former Superintendent of Florida Schools
  - Joseph C. Hoagland, 58, American businessman, first president of the Royal Baking Powder Company

== December 9, 1899 (Saturday) ==
- An explosion killed 32 coal miners at the Carbon Hill mines in Carbonado, Washington.
- Born: Jean de Brunhoff, French writer, co-creator of Babar the Elephant; in Paris (d. 1937, tuberculosis)
- Died: James Wilde, 1st Baron Penzance, PC, 83, British judge and rose breeder

== December 10, 1899 (Sunday) ==
- Four-month-old Sobhuza II began his 82-year reign as King of Swaziland, on the death of his father, Ngwane V; his grandmother Labotsibeni Mdluli served as queen regent.
- At the Battle of Stormberg, the British Army made a disastrous attempt to surprise the Boer position in Natal and suffered the loss of 687 officers and men.
- The college fraternity Delta Sigma Phi was founded at the City College of New York, by Charles A. Tonsor Jr. and Meyer Boskey.
- Died: King Ngwane V of Swaziland, 23

== December 11, 1899 (Monday) ==
- Second Boer War: At the Battle of Magersfontein, Boers defeated British forces trying to relieve the Siege of Kimberley.
- Philippine-American War: Filipino General Tierona surrendered the province of Cagayan to U.S. Navy Captain McCalla of the USS Newark (C-1).
- Born: Joan Stevenson Abbott, Australian World War II army hospital matron; in Normanby Hill, Brisbane, Queensland (d. 1975)
- Died:
  - Edward Ferrero, 68, Spanish-born American dance instructor and Union Army brevet major general
  - Major-General Andrew Wauchope CB CMG, 53, British Army officer, was killed in action at the Battle of Magersfontein.

== December 12, 1899 (Tuesday) ==
- Dr. George Franklin Grant, an African-American dentist, received U.S. Patent No. 638,920, for the invention of the first golf tee. Prior to the creation of a device designed to hold a sphere in place above the ground, raising a golf ball to a position to hit it a long distance through the air required fashioning dirt into a cone.

== December 13, 1899 (Wednesday) ==
- General French routed Boer troops who had been advancing into the Cape Colony toward Noupoort.
- Died:
  - Julius Walker Adams, 87, American civil engineer and railroad engineer
  - Sir George Airey Kirkpatrick KCMG PC QC, 58, Canadian politician, former Lieutenant Governor of Ontario
  - Lucius Richard O'Brien RCA, 67, Canadian landscape painter
  - Jasper Packard, 67, American attorney and Civil War veteran, former member of the United States House of Representatives from Indiana

== December 14, 1899 (Thursday) ==
- Walther Hauser was elected President of Switzerland by the Swiss Federal Assembly.
- Born: DeFord Bailey, American country musician; in Smith County, Tennessee (d. 1982)

== December 15, 1899 (Friday) ==
- Battle of Colenso: Britain's General Redvers Buller lost 1,097 officers and men in a fight against the Boers in Natal, the third serious British reverse in South Africa in what would become known as the "Black Week".
- The Glasgow School of Art opened its new building, the most notable work of Scottish architect Charles Rennie Mackintosh.
- The Republican National Committee voted to hold its 1900 national convention in Philadelphia, to start on June 19, 1900.
- Born: Harold Abrahams, English track and field athlete, winner of 1 gold medal and 1 silver medal in the 1924 Summer Olympics; in Bedford, Bedfordshire (d. 1978)

== December 16, 1899 (Saturday) ==
- The Association football club A.C. Milan was founded in Italy.
- Born:
  - Noël Coward, English actor, playwright (Blithe Spirit) and composer ("Mad Dogs and Englishmen"); in Teddington, Middlesex (d. 1973)
  - Aleksander Zawadzki, President of Poland; in Będzin, Piotrków Governorate (d. 1964, cancer)
- Died: Fred Waterman, 53–54, American professional baseball player

== December 17, 1899 (Sunday) ==
- The Baeyer–Villiger oxidation, an organic reaction that forms an ester from a ketone or a lactone from a cyclic ketone, using peroxyacids or peroxides as the oxidant, was first reported by chemists Adolf von Baeyer and Victor Villiger, who published their findings in the scientific journal Chemische Berichte.
- In the Anglo-Egyptian Sudan, British troops reoccupied the Sudanese city of El Obeid (al-Ubayad), the center of the Mahdi religious movement.
- Died:
  - Bernard Quaritch, 80, German-born British bookseller
  - Frederick Roberts VC, 27, British Army officer, died of wounds received 2 days earlier at the Battle of Colenso.

== December 18, 1899 (Monday) ==
- The British War Office sent Lord Roberts to South Africa to become the new commander of British forces in the Second Boer War, with Lord Kitchener to be second in command, and announced that 100,000 additional men would be sent as the British death toll rose to 7630.
- Stock prices fell drastically at the New York exchanges and the Produce Exchange Trust Company failed.
- Born: Peter Wessel Zapffe, Norwegian author and philosopher; in Tromsø (d. 1990)
- Died: Fred Truax, 30–31, American professional baseball player

== December 19, 1899 (Tuesday) ==
- New York City's clearinghouse banks pooled together a $10,000,000 loan fund to prevent further failures of companies.
- Born: Martin Luther King Sr. (born Michael King), American Baptist pastor, missionary, and early figure in the civil rights movement; in Stockbridge, Georgia (d. 1984)
- Died: Henry Ware Lawton, 56, United States Army major general and Medal of Honor recipient, was killed by a Filipino sniper at the Battle of San Mateo on Luzon.

== December 20, 1899 (Wednesday) ==
- The U.S. government arrested nine customs officials in Havana on charges of collusion to defraud the government.
- Born:
  - Finn Ronne, Norwegian-American explorer; in Horten (d. 1980)
  - John Sparkman, American politician, member of the U.S. House of Representatives and U.S. Senate from Alabama; near Hartselle, Alabama (d. 1985)

== December 21, 1899 (Thursday) ==
- U.S. Army General Leonard Wood arrived in Havana to become the new Governor-General of Cuba.
- Died: Charles Lamoureux, 65, French conductor and violinist

== December 22, 1899 (Friday) ==
- More than 40 schoolchildren from Belgium drowned in the capsizing of a boat near the French town of Frelinghien on the River Lys that serves as boundary between Belgium and France.
- A fire killed 16 children in Quincy, Illinois.
- Died:
  - Hugh Grosvenor, 1st Duke of Westminster, 74, British landowner and politician
  - Dwight L. Moody, 62, American evangelist and publisher
  - Pascual Ortega Portales, 60, Chilean painter

== December 23, 1899 (Saturday) ==
- Forty coal miners were killed in an explosion near Brownsville, Pennsylvania.
- Sir Reginald Wingate was appointed as the new British Governor-General of Anglo-Egyptian Sudan.
- Died: Dorman Bridgman Eaton, 76, American lawyer instrumental in federal Civil Service reform

== December 24, 1899 (Sunday) ==
- At the Vatican, Pope Leo XIII opened the Holy Door at Saint Peter's Basilica, inaugurating the Jubilee year of 1900.
- The wreck of the British steamship Ariosto off the coast of Hatteras, North Carolina, in the U.S. drowned 21 of the crew.

== December 25, 1899 (Monday) ==
- What was billed as the first "transcontinental" college football game in the U.S. took place at Richmond Field in San Francisco as the Carlisle Indian School of Carlisle, Pennsylvania defeated the host University of California Golden Bears, 2 to 0, in a post-season meeting. California had finished the 1899 college football season unbeaten, though not untied, with a record of 7-0-1 while the Carlisle Indians had a record of 8-2-0. The only previous game between and eastern team and a western team had been a 24-4 win by the University of Chicago over Stanford University, played on December 25, 1894.
- Born:
  - Humphrey Bogart, American film actor known for Casablanca and The African Queen); in New York City (d. 1957)
  - Frank Ferguson, American character actor known for the TV series My Friend Flicka; in Ferndale, California (d. 1978)
- Died: Elliott Coues, 57, American ornithologist

== December 26, 1899 (Tuesday) ==
- Pinnacle Rock, a balancing rock in Cumberland Gap on the Tennessee and Kentucky border in the U.S., fell down.

== December 27, 1899 (Wednesday) ==
- Italian opera baritone singer Antonio Scotti appeared for the first time at the Metropolitan Opera in New York City, performing the title role of Mozart's opera Don Giovanni. A favorite at The Met, Scotti would continue as the opera house's principal artist for 33 seasons.
- Died: Harry Escombe PC, 61, South African statesman, former prime minister of the Colony of Natal

== December 28, 1899 (Thursday) ==
- The bodies of the officers and men killed in the 1898 explosion of the battleship USS Maine were reinterred at the Arlington National Cemetery.
- Born: Eugeniusz Bodo, Polish film actor (His Excellency, The Shop Assistant, Pieśniarz Warszawy), director and producer (birthplace uncertain) (d. 1943 in Soviet Gulag)

== December 29, 1899 (Friday) ==
- The British Royal Navy cruiser HMS Magicienne seized the German steamer, Bundesroth, at Delagoa Bay in Portuguese East Africa (modern-day Mozambique), on grounds that German officers and men were being brought to supplement the Boer Army. The Bundesroth was then escorted to Durban in Britain's Natal Colony.
- Born: Nie Rongzhen, Chinese Communist military leader; in Jiangjin, Chongqing (d. 1992)
- Died: Sylvester Malone, 78, Irish-born American Roman Catholic priest

== December 30, 1899 (Saturday) ==
- General Wood completed the appointment of a cabinet of ministers composed of Cuban residents, with Diego Tamayo, Luis Esterez, Juan B. Hernandez, Enrique Varona, Jose R. Villaton and Ruiz Rivera taking office.
- According to an account first published in a Canadian newspaper in 1942, at midnight on 30 December the passenger and cargo liner SS Warrimoo positioned herself at the intersection of the Equator and the 180th meridian in such a manner that the ship was simultaneously located in the Northern, Southern, Eastern and Western Hemispheres, in both summer and winter, and in both the 19th and 20th centuries (counting 1900 as the first year of the 20th century). However, the navigation technology of that era would likely not have allowed the Warrimoo to position herself with such precision. Snopes rates this story as "Unproven".
- Died:
  - Eugène Bertrand, 65, French comedian, theatre managing director and opera house director
  - Sir James Paget, 1st Baronet FRS HFRSE, 85, English surgeon and pathologist

== December 31, 1899 (Sunday) ==
- The German government and Kaiser Wilhelm II declared that the 20th century would begin on January 1, 1900. However, some argued that December 31, 1899 was not the last day of the 19th century and the year 1900 was still included until the year later.
- Retrospectively, day zero for dates in Microsoft Excel (similar to January 1, 1970 being day zero for Unix time). This is to ensure backwards compatibility with Lotus 1-2-3, which had a bug misinterpreting 1900 as a leap year.
- Died:
  - Manuel Carrillo Tablas, 77, Mexican philanthropist and mayor of Orizaba
  - Carl Millöcker, 57, Viennese composer and conductor
  - Jane Mitchel, 79, Irish nationalist
