= Ulysses N. Arnett =

American politician

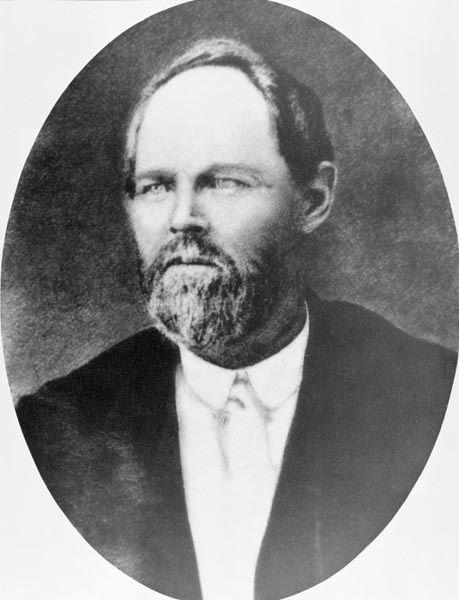

President of the Senate of West Virginia
- In office 1877–1879
- Preceded by: Daniel D. Johnson
- Succeeded by: Daniel D. Johnson

Member of the West Virginia Senate

Personal details
- Born: Ulysses Near Arnett; November 7, 1820 Rivesville, West Virginia
- Died: December 1, 1880 (aged 60) Marion County, West Virginia
- Party: Democratic
- Spouse(s): Elizabeth Cunningham m. 1837

Ulysses Near Arnett (November 7, 1820 – December 1, 1880) was the Democratic President of the West Virginia Senate from Marion County and served from 1877 to 1879. He drowned in 1880.

Preceded by Daniel D. Johnson	President of the WV Senate; 1877–1879	Succeeded by Daniel D. Johnson
