= Carlos A. Sperry =

American politician

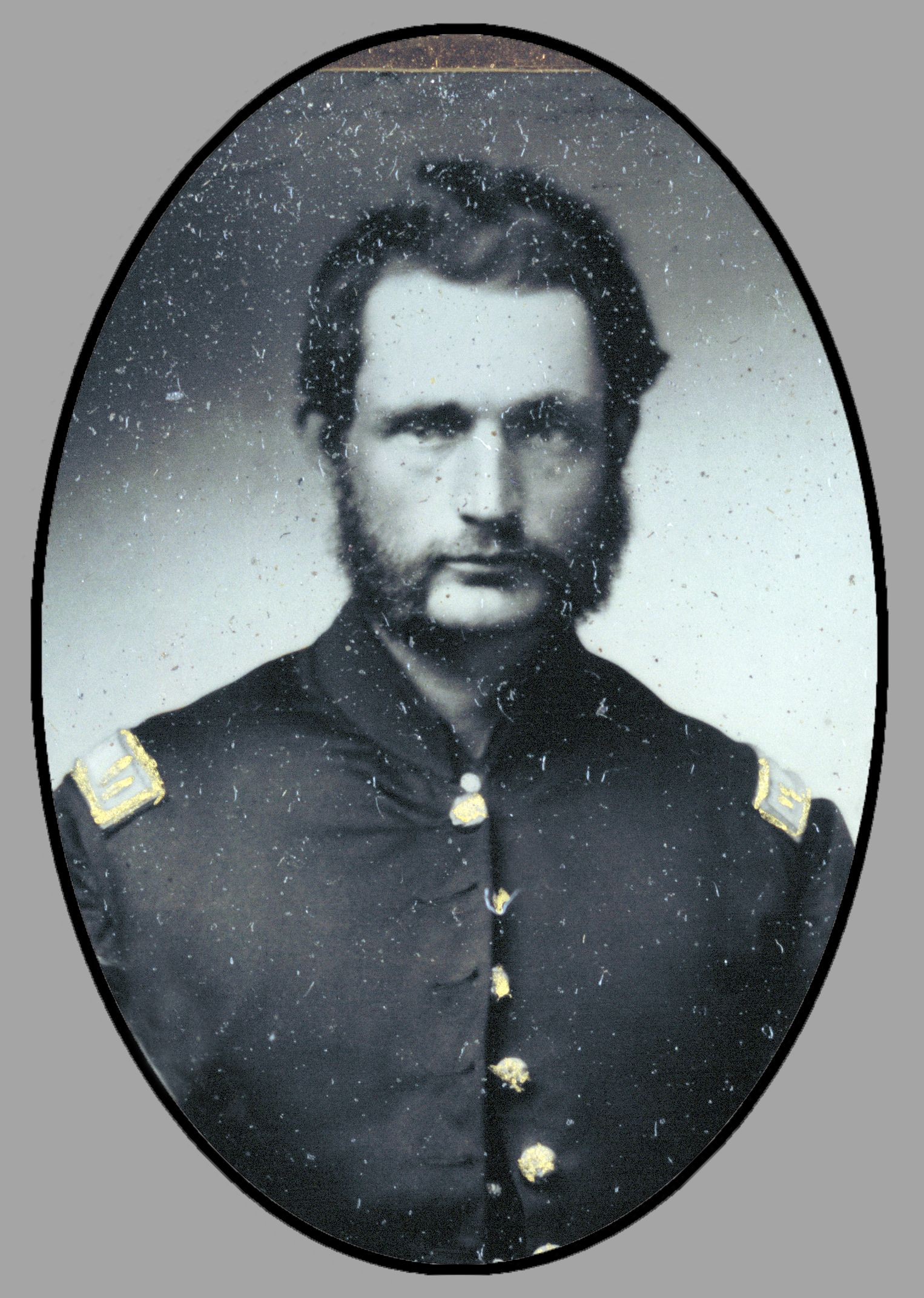

President of the Senate of West Virginia
- In office 1872
- Preceded by: Lewis Baker
- Succeeded by: Daniel D. Johnson

Member of the West Virginia Senate

Personal details
- Born: Carlos Augustus Sperry; 1832 Rock Creek, Ohio, U.S.
- Died: May 9, 1902 (aged 69–70)
- Party: Democratic

Carlos Augustus Sperry was the Democratic President of the West Virginia Senate from Greenbrier County and served in 1872.

Political offices
Preceded by Lewis Baker	President of the WV Senate; 1872	Succeeded by Daniel D. Johnson
