= J. De Witt Warner =

American politician (1851–1925)

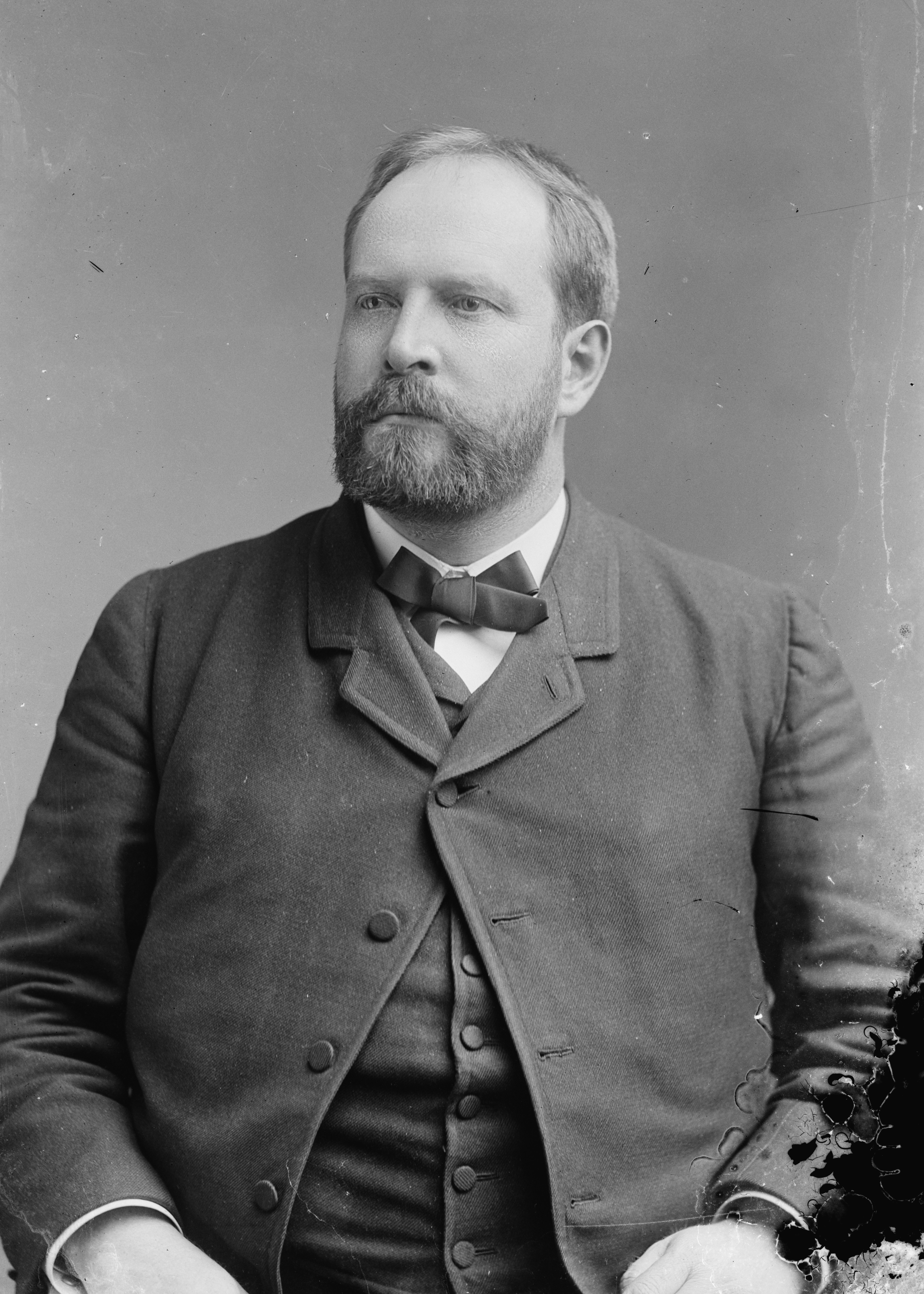
- Portrait by C. M. Bell c. 1891–1894

Member of the U.S. House of Representatives from New York
- In office March 4, 1891 – March 3, 1895
- Preceded by: John Quinn
- Succeeded by: Richard C. Shannon
- Constituency: 11th district (1891–93); 13th district (1893–95)

Personal details
- Born: October 30, 1851 near Reading, New York, U.S.
- Died: May 27, 1925 (age 73) New York City, U.S.
- Party: Democratic
- Spouse: Lillian Hudson
- Children: 1 son, 1 daughter

John DeWitt Warner (October 30, 1851 – May 27, 1925) served as a U.S. Representative for parts of Manhattan, including Midtown, Hell's Kitchen, and Chelsea, from 1891 to 1895.

== Early life and education ==
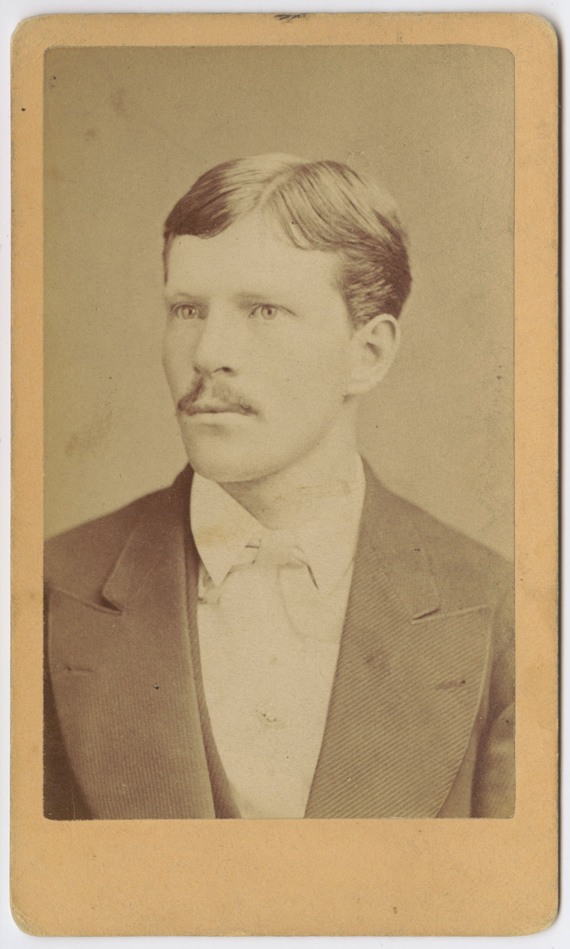
Warner's Cornell University yearbook photo, 1871

Born on a farm near Reading, New York, Warner moved with his parents to Big Stream (later Glenora), New York, and later to Rock Stream, New York. He completed preparatory studies and attended the district schools and Starkey Seminary, Eddytown, New York. Warner graduated from Cornell University in 1872 and from Albany Law School in 1876.

Prior to attending law school, Warner taught at the Ithaca and Albany Academies for four years. Upon graduation, he began practicing law in New York City. He was elected as an Alumni Trustee of Cornell in June 1882.

== Career ==
Warner was president of the American Free Trade League from 1905 to 1909, and served as special counsel for the dock department advising on terminal work in 1911 and 1912. He served on a commission to revise the New York banking laws in 1913.

Warner was a charter member of Cornell's chapter of Delta Kappa Epsilon and a member of the Irving Literary Society. He wrote the lyrics for the Cornell song 1875. He was one of the founders of the National Sculpture Society and served president of the Art Commission of the City of New York.

=== U.S. Congress ===
In 1894, Warner was one of six congressmen to vote in favor of a single tax amendment to the Wilson–Gorman Tariff Act. Proposed by Georgist and fellow Democrat James G. Maguire of California, it was intended as a substitute for the bill's proposed income tax. It would have levied a direct tax of $31,311,125 on land values nationwide. After this was rejected, Warner voted in favor of the original version of the bill, but against the final version sent back by the Senate several months later.

== Marriage and family ==
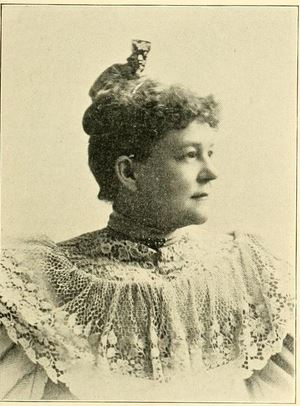
Lillian Hudson,
Warner's wife

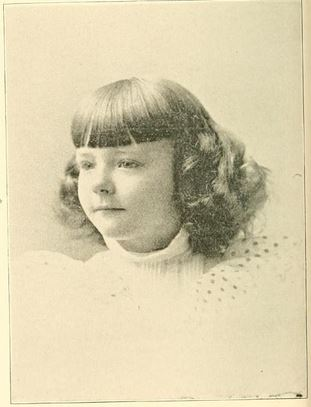
Charlot Lillian Warner,
their daughter

He married Lillian Hudson, a native of New York. She descended from an old New York family. Her paternal grandfather served with distinction in the War of 1812. She graduated at the Ithaca Academy and then attended Cornell University. They had two children, a son and a daughter, Charlot Lillian Warner.

U.S. House of Representatives
| Preceded by John Quinn | Member of the U.S. House of Representatives from New York's 11th congressional district 1891–1893 | Succeeded by Amos J. Cummings |
| Preceded by Ashbel P. Fitch | Member of the U.S. House of Representatives from New York's 13th congressional district 1893–1895 | Succeeded by Richard C. Shannon |
