= Daniel D. Johnson =

American politician (1836–1893)

Daniel Johnson
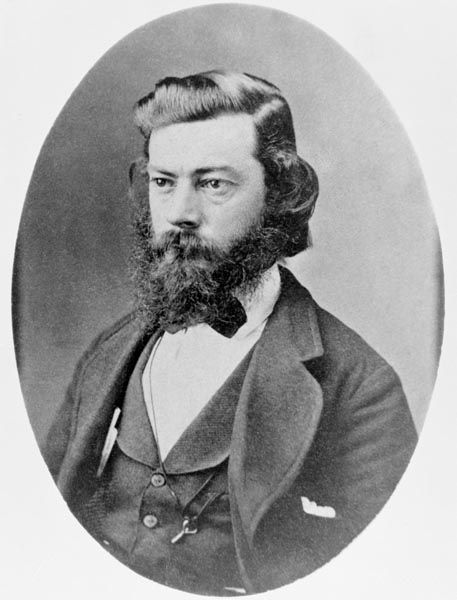

President of the Senate of West Virginia
- In office 1872–1877, 1878–1881
- Preceded by: Carlos A. Sperry (first term); Ulysses N. Arnett (second term)
- Succeeded by: Ulysses N. Arnett (first term); Albert E. Summers (second term)

Member of the West Virginia Senate

Personal details
- Born: Daniel Dye Johnson; April 28, 1836 Tyler County, Virginia (now West Virginia)
- Died: December 18, 1893 (aged 57) Long Reach, West Virginia, United States
- Party: Democratic
- Spouse: Mary Maria Martin

Military service
- Allegiance: United States
- Branch/service: United States Army
- Years of service: 1862–1865
- Rank: Colonel, USV
- Commands: 14th West Virginia Infantry; 2nd Brigade, Kanawha Division
- Battles/wars: American Civil War

Daniel Dye Johnson (28 April 1836 - 18 December 1893) was an officer in the Union Army during the American Civil War. He later became a state senator and Senate President of the West Virginia Senate from Tyler County and served from 1872 to 1877 and from 1879 to 1881. He died in 1893.

== Family ==
Johnson was one of 17 children of William Henry Johnson (1789-1871), by his second wife Elizabeth Dye Johnson (1809-1869). Johnson's older brother Okey Johnson (1834-1903) was a lawyer, politician, and West Virginia Supreme Court judge; he also served as the Dean of the West Virginia University Law School. Their much younger brother Thomas Corskadon Johnson (1848-1922) was a prominent Baptist minister in Charleston who served many terms as the moderator of the Kanawha Valley Baptist Association and was a local leader in the fight for prohibition.

Political offices
Preceded by Carlos A. Sperry	President of the West Virginia Senate; 1872–1877, 1878–1881	Succeeded by Ulysses N. Arnett
