= Richard C. Shannon =

American politician (1839–1920)

Richard Cutts Shannon
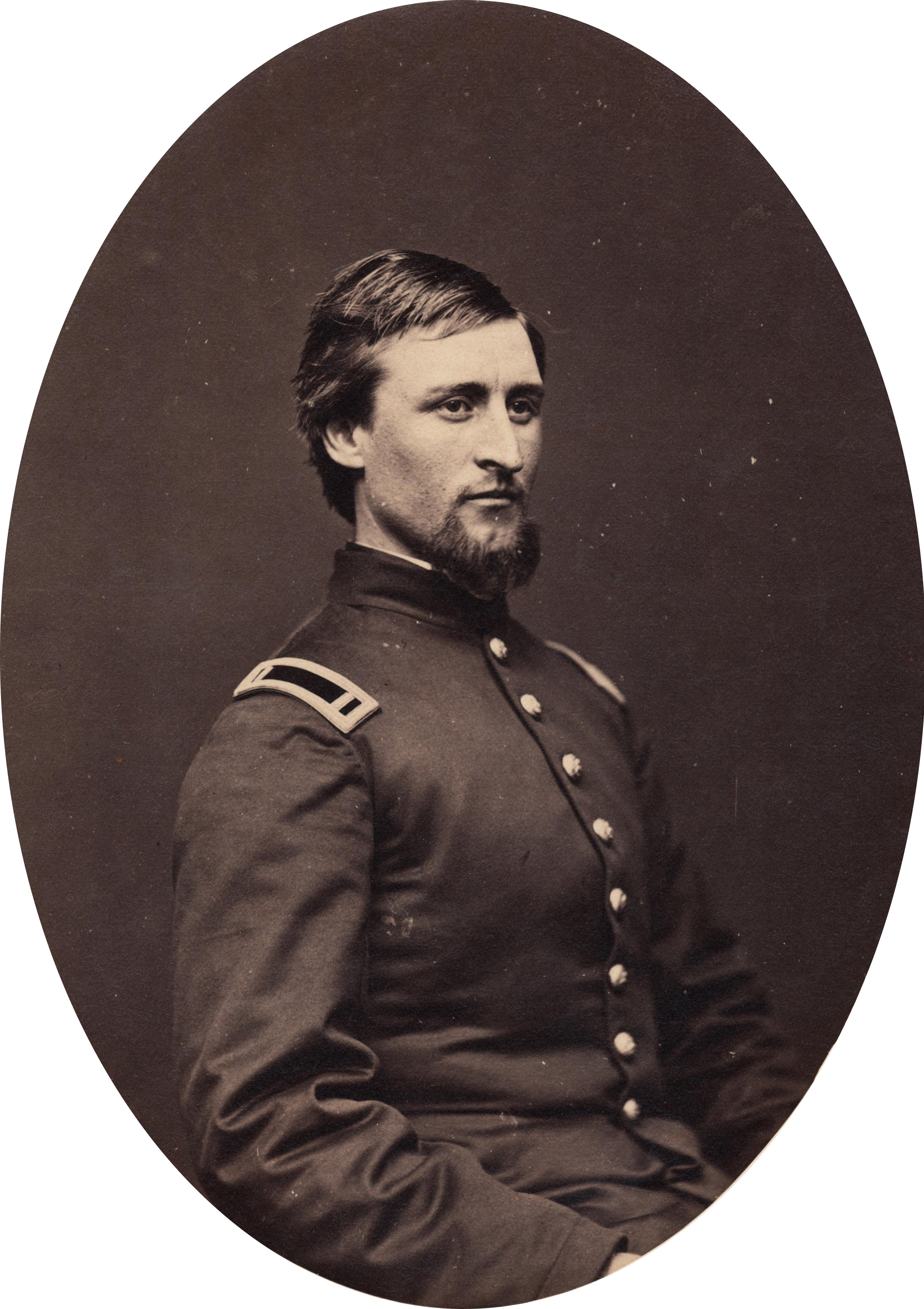

United States Minister to Costa Rica
- In office October 31, 1891 – April 30, 1893
- President: Benjamin Harrison
- Preceded by: Romualdo Pacheco
- Succeeded by: Lewis Baker

United States Minister to Nicaragua
- In office October 13, 1891 – April 30, 1893
- President: Benjamin Harrison
- Preceded by: Romualdo Pacheco
- Succeeded by: Lewis Baker

United States Minister to El Salvador
- In office October 31, 1891 – April 30, 1893
- President: Benjamin Harrison
- Preceded by: Romualdo Pacheco
- Succeeded by: Lewis Baker

Member of the U.S. House of Representatives from New York's 13th district
- In office March 4, 1895 – March 3, 1899
- Preceded by: John De Witt Warner
- Succeeded by: Jefferson Levy

Personal details
- Born: February 12, 1839 New London, Connecticut, U.S.
- Died: October 5, 1920 (aged 81) Brockport, New York, U.S.
- Resting place: Lake View Cemetery; Brockport, New York; 43.1914°N 77.9397°W
- Party: Republican

Richard Cutts Shannon (February 12, 1839 – October 5, 1920) was a U.S. representative from New York.

== Biography ==
Born in New London, Connecticut, Shannon was graduated from the grammar and high schools at Biddeford, Maine, and from Waterville College (now Colby College), Maine. During the Civil War enlisted in Company H, Fifth Regiment, Maine Volunteer Infantry, June 24, 1861. He was appointed first lieutenant October 10, 1861. He served as aide-de-camp to General Slocum March 15, 1862. He served as captain and assistant adjutant general of Volunteers October 2, 1862. Honorably discharged February 10, 1866. He was appointed secretary of the United States legation at Rio de Janeiro, Brazil, in 1871, and served until March 1875, when he resigned. Took charge of the Botanical Garden Railroad Co. in 1876, an American enterprise in Brazil, of which he subsequently became the vice president, general manager, and president. He returned to the United States in 1883 and was graduated from the law department of Columbia College, New York City, in 1885. He was admitted to the New York bar in 1886 and commenced practice in New York City. He was appointed Envoy Extraordinary and Minister Plenipotentiary to Nicaragua, El Salvador, and Costa Rica in 1891, and served until April 1893.

Shannon was elected as a Republican to the Fifty-fourth and Fifty-fifth Congresses (March 4, 1895 – March 3, 1899). He declined to be a candidate for renomination in 1898. He resumed the practice of his profession in New York City. He retired in 1903 and moved to Brockport, New York, where he died October 5, 1920. He was interred in Lake View Cemetery.

U.S. House of Representatives
Preceded by John De Witt Warner	Member of the U.S. House of Representatives from New York's 13th congressional district 1895–1899	Succeeded by Jefferson M. Levy
