= Okey Johnson =

American judge (1834–1903)

Okey Johnson (born Long Reach in what was then the state of Virginia, March 24, 1834; died New York City, New York, June 16, 1903) was a lawyer, politician, judge, and educator in the state of West Virginia. He served as a justice of the Supreme Court of Appeals of West Virginia from January 1, 1877, to December 31, 1888.

After graduating from Marietta High School across the river in Ohio in 1856, Johnson entered Harvard Law School, earning a degree in 1858. After several years farming and undertaking trading voyages on riverboats, he established a law practice in Parkersburg in May 1862. An active Democrat, Johnson was an elector for George B. McClellan in 1864. Johnson was elected to the state senate in 1870 and to the constitutional convention of 1872. In 1876 he was elected to the Supreme Court of Appeals, serving a 12-year term.

In 1896 Johnson served on a committee of the West Virginia Academy of Science to inquire into forest protection and draft legislation to set aside forest reservations in the state.

Johnson served as the dean of the West Virginia University College of Law from 1895 to 1903. He died in New York City after having surgery there.

== Family ==
Johnson was one of seventeen children of William Henry Johnson (1789-1871), by his second wife Elizabeth Dye Johnson (1809-1869). Johnson's younger brother Daniel Dye Johnson (1836-1893) was a Union officer in the Civil War and served as president of the West Virginia State Senate. Their much younger brother Thomas Corskadon Johnson (1848-1922) was a prominent Baptist minister in Charleston who served many terms as the moderator of the Kanawha Valley Baptist Association and was a local leader in the fight for prohibition.

Okey Johnson married Sarah Elizabeth Stephenson (1836-1921), widow of Benjamin Jackson. They had five children.
