= 14th West Virginia Infantry Regiment =

- Flag of West Virginia
- Active: August 25, 1862 to June 28, 1865
- Country: United States
- Allegiance: Union
- Branch: Infantry
- Engagements: Skirmish near Burlington; Battle of Cloyd's Mountain; Battle of Rutherford's Farm; Second Battle of Kernstown; Battle of Berryville; Third Battle of Winchester; Battle of Fisher's Hill; Battle of Cedar Creek

The 14th West Virginia Infantry Regiment was an infantry regiment that served in the Union Army during the American Civil War.

== Service ==
The 14th West Virginia Infantry Regiment was organized at Wheeling in western Virginia on August 25, 1862. Most of its men came from neighboring areas in Ohio and Pennsylvania, and a number of the men of Company A were from Doddridge and Harrison County, West Virginia. Attached to Railroad Division, West Virginia, to January, 1863. New Creek, W. Va., Defenses Upper Potomac, 8th Army Corps, Middle Dept., to March, 1863. 5th Brigade, 1st Division. 8th Army Corps, to June, 1863. Mulligan's Brigade, Scammon's Division, West Virginia, to December, 1863. 2nd Brigade, 2nd Division, West Virginia, to April. 1864. 2nd Brigade, 2nd Infantry Division, West Virginia, to January, 1865. 1st Brigade, 2nd Infantry Division, West Virginia, to June, 1865.

== Detailed Service ==
Ordered to Clarksburg, W. Va., and guard duty on the Upper Potomac, Headquarters at New Creek, until June, 1863. Expedition to Greenland Gap April 13–22, 1863. Action at Greenland Gap April 25 (Co. "A"). Duty at New Creek, Petersburg and Romney until April, 1864. Two companies were engaged in a skirmish with Confederate forces near Burlington, West Virginia on November 16, 1863, losing First Lieutenant George W. Hardman, Sergeant Samuel H. Morris and Private William Gardner killed. Burlington and Petersburg Turnpike November 19. Salem December 16. Jackson River, near Covington, December 19. Operations in Hampshire and Hardy Counties December 31, 1863 – January 5, 1864. Operations in Hampshire and Hardy Counties against Rosser January 27-February 7, 1864. Evacuation of Petersburg January 30. Crook's Expedition against Virginia & Tennessee Railroad May 2–19. Battle of Cloyd's Mountain May 9. New River Bridge May 10. Cove Mountain or Grassy Lick, near Wytheville May 10. Salt Pond Mountain and Gap Mountain May 12–13. Hunter's Expedition against Lynchburg May 26-July 1. Diamond Hill June 17. Lynchburg June 17–18. Retreat to Charleston June 18-July 1. Buford's Gap June 20. About Salem June 21. Moved to the Shenandoah Valley July 12–15. Snicker's Ferry July 17–18. Battle of Rutherford's Farm July 20. Second Battle of Kernstown July 23–24. Martinsburg July 25. Sheridan's Shenandoah Valley Campaign August 6-November 28. Strasburg August 15. Halltown August 24 and 26. Battle of Berryville September 3. Third Battle of Winchester September 19. Fisher's Hill September 22. Battle of Cedar Creek October 19. Duty at Camp Russell and in Shenandoah Valley until December. Myerstown November 28. Duty at Martinsburg, Cumberland, Md., and Winchester, Va., until June, 1865. On March 22, 1865, a detachment of Company H, armed in part with Henry repeating rifles, engaged a force of Confederates near Patterson Creek Station, West Virginia. Mustered out June 28, 1865.

== Casualties ==
The 14th West Virginia Volunteer Infantry Regiment suffered 7 officers and 81 enlisted men killed in battle or died from wounds, and 1 officer and 157 enlisted men dead from disease for a total of 170 fatalities.

== Commanders ==
- Colonel Daniel D. Johnson

Lt Colonel Chapman J. Stuart

== See also ==
- West Virginia Units in the Civil War
- West Virginia in the Civil War
