= William L. Merry =

American diplomat

William Lawrence Merry (December 27, 1835 in New York– December 14, 1911) was an American ambassador to Costa Rica, El Salvador, and Nicaragua.

Merry was the first U.S. Minister to be resident in San Jose.
