= List of ambassadors of the United States to Nicaragua =

Ambassador of the United States to Nicaragua
- Seal of the United States Department of State

- Flag of a United States ambassador

- Incumbent; Elias Baumann; Chargé d'Affairs ad interim since December 24, 2025
- Nominator: The president of the United States
- Appointer: The president; with Senate advice and consent
- Inaugural holder: John B. Kerr as Chargé d'Affaires
- Formation: February 18, 1851
- Website: U.S. Embassy in Nicaragua

The following is a list of United States ambassadors, or other chiefs of mission, to Nicaragua. The title given by the United States State Department to this position is currently Ambassador Extraordinary and Plenipotentiary.

== Ambassadors ==
Representative	Title	Presentation of credentials	Termination of mission	Appointed by
John B. Kerr	Chargé d'Affaires	February 18, 1851	June 1, 1853	Millard Fillmore
Solon Borland	Envoy Extraordinary and Minister Plenipotentiary	April 18, 1853	April 17, 1854	Franklin Pierce
John H. Wheeler	Minister Resident	April 7, 1855	October 23, 1856	Franklin Pierce
Mirabeau B. Lamar	Minister Resident	February 8, 1858	May 20, 1859	James Buchanan
Alexander Dimitry	Minister Resident	December 7, 1859	April 27, 1861	James Buchanan
Andrew B. Dickinson	Minister Resident	July 11, 1861	January 15, 1863	Abraham Lincoln
Thomas H. Clay	Minister Resident	January 15, 1863	May 31, 1863	Abraham Lincoln
Andrew B. Dickinson	Minister Resident and Extraordinary	May 31, 1863	July 29, 1869	Abraham Lincoln
Charles N. Riotte	Minister Resident	July 29, 1869	January 15, 1873	Ulysses S. Grant
George Williamson	Minister Resident	November 1, 1873	January 31, 1879	Ulysses S. Grant
Cornelius A. Logan	Minister Resident	July 30, 1879	April 15, 1882	Rutherford B. Hayes
Henry C. Hall	Minister Resident	August 12, 1882	November 2, 1882	Chester A. Arthur
Henry C. Hall	Envoy Extraordinary and Minister Plenipotentiary	November 2, 1882	May 23, 1889	Chester A. Arthur
Lansing B. Mizner	Envoy Extraordinary and Minister Plenipotentiary	August 7, 1889	December 31, 1890	Benjamin Harrison
Romualdo Pacheco	Envoy Extraordinary and Minister Plenipotentiary	May 21, 1891	October 13, 1891	Benjamin Harrison
Richard Cutts Shannon	Envoy Extraordinary and Minister Plenipotentiary	October 13, 1891	April 30, 1893	Benjamin Harrison
Lewis Baker	Envoy Extraordinary and Minister Plenipotentiary	May 13, 1893	December 9, 1897	Grover Cleveland
William L. Merry	Envoy Extraordinary and Minister Plenipotentiary	March 1, 1899	August 24, 1908	William McKinley
John Gardner Coolidge	Envoy Extraordinary and Minister Plenipotentiary	August 24, 1908	November 21, 1908	Theodore Roosevelt
John H. Gregory, Jr.	Chargé d'Affaires ad interim	November 21, 1908	March 12, 1909	Theodore Roosevelt
Elliott Northcott	Envoy Extraordinary and Minister Plenipotentiary	February 21, 1911	June 23, 1911	William H. Taft
George T. Weitzel	Envoy Extraordinary and Minister Plenipotentiary	January 22, 1912	April 19, 1913	William H. Taft
Benjamin L. Jefferson	Envoy Extraordinary and Minister Plenipotentiary	September 5, 1913	October 24, 1921	Woodrow Wilson
John E. Ramer	Envoy Extraordinary and Minister Plenipotentiary	December 30, 1921	April 5, 1925	Warren G. Harding
Charles C. Eberhardt	Envoy Extraordinary and Minister Plenipotentiary	August 7, 1925	May 10, 1929	Calvin Coolidge
Matthew E. Hanna	Envoy Extraordinary and Minister Plenipotentiary	April 11, 1930	September 6, 1933	Herbert Hoover
Arthur Bliss Lane	Envoy Extraordinary and Minister Plenipotentiary	December 7, 1933	March 14, 1936	Franklin D. Roosevelt
Boaz W. Long	Envoy Extraordinary and Minister Plenipotentiary	March 19, 1936	April 1, 1938	Franklin D. Roosevelt
Meredith Nicholson	Envoy Extraordinary and Minister Plenipotentiary	June 9, 1938	February 27, 1941	Franklin D. Roosevelt
Pierre de Lagarde Boal	Envoy Extraordinary and Minister Plenipotentiary	July 24, 1941	March 5, 1942	Franklin D. Roosevelt
James B. Stewart	Envoy Extraordinary and Minister Plenipotentiary	June 12, 1942	April 14, 1943	Franklin D. Roosevelt
James B. Stewart	Ambassador Extraordinary and Plenipotentiary	April 14, 1943	January 4, 1945	Franklin D. Roosevelt
Fletcher Warren	Ambassador Extraordinary and Plenipotentiary	May 9, 1945	May 4, 1947	Harry S. Truman
George P. Shaw	Ambassador Extraordinary and Plenipotentiary	September 1, 1948	June 8, 1949	Harry S. Truman
Capus M. Waynick	Ambassador Extraordinary and Plenipotentiary	July 12, 1949	July 22, 1951	Harry S. Truman
Thomas E. Whelan	Ambassador Extraordinary and Plenipotentiary	November 3, 1951	March 22, 1961	Harry S. Truman
Aaron S. Brown	Ambassador Extraordinary and Plenipotentiary	April 21, 1961	May 3, 1967	John F. Kennedy
Kennedy M. Crockett	Ambassador Extraordinary and Plenipotentiary	August 21, 1967	April 19, 1970	Lyndon B. Johnson
Turner B. Shelton	Ambassador Extraordinary and Plenipotentiary	November 20, 1970	August 11, 1975	Richard Nixon
James D. Theberge	Ambassador Extraordinary and Plenipotentiary	August 11, 1975	June 8, 1977	Gerald Ford
Mauricio Solaún	Ambassador Extraordinary and Plenipotentiary	September 30, 1977	February 26, 1979	Jimmy Carter
Lawrence A. Pezzullo	Ambassador Extraordinary and Plenipotentiary	July 31, 1979	August 18, 1981	Jimmy Carter
Anthony Cecil Eden Quainton	Ambassador Extraordinary and Plenipotentiary	March 26, 1982	May 6, 1984	Ronald Reagan
Harry E. Bergold, Jr.	Ambassador Extraordinary and Plenipotentiary	May 31, 1984	July 1, 1987	Ronald Reagan
Richard Huntington Melton	Ambassador Extraordinary and Plenipotentiary	May 4, 1988	July 12, 1988	Ronald Reagan
Jack Leonard	Chargé d'Affaires ad interim	July 11, 1988	June 21, 1990	Ronald Reagan
Harry W. Shlaudeman	Ambassador Extraordinary and Plenipotentiary	June 21, 1990	March 14, 1992	George H. W. Bush
Ron Godard	Chargé d’Affaires a.i.	March 14, 1992	September 8, 1993	George H. W. Bush
John Francis Maisto	Ambassador Extraordinary and Plenipotentiary	September 8, 1993	November 15, 1996	Bill Clinton
Lino Gutierrez	Ambassador Extraordinary and Plenipotentiary	December 5, 1996	July 21, 1999	Bill Clinton
Oliver P. Garza	Ambassador Extraordinary and Plenipotentiary	September 24, 1999	August 30, 2002	Bill Clinton
Barbara C. Moore	Ambassador Extraordinary and Plenipotentiary	September 13, 2002	July 15, 2005	George W. Bush
Paul A. Trivelli	Ambassador Extraordinary and Plenipotentiary	September 9, 2005	August 6, 2008	George W. Bush
Robert J. Callahan	Ambassador Extraordinary and Plenipotentiary	August 27, 2008	July 19, 2011	George W. Bush
Robert R. Downes	Chargé d’Affaires a.i.	July 19, 2011	March 30, 2012	Barack Obama
Phyllis M. Powers	Ambassador Extraordinary and Plenipotentiary	May 3, 2012	August 5, 2015	Barack Obama
Laura Farnsworth Dogu	Ambassador Extraordinary and Plenipotentiary	October 6, 2015	October 30, 2018	Barack Obama
Kevin K. Sullivan	Ambassador Extraordinary and Plenipotentiary	November 14, 2018	May 19, 2023	Donald Trump
Carla Fleharty	Chargé d’Affaires a.i.	May 20, 2023	June 28, 2023	Joe Biden
Kevin O'Reilly	Chargé d’Affaires a.i.	June 28, 2023	December 23, 2025	Joe Biden
Elias Baumann	Chargé d’Affaires a.i.	December 24, 2025	Present	Donald Trump

== See also ==
- Embassy of the United States, Chișinău
- Nicaragua – United States relations
- Foreign relations of Nicaragua
- Ambassadors of the United States
