= List of executive actions by William Howard Taft =

The president of the United States may take any of several kinds of executive actions.

Executive orders are issued to help officers and agencies of the executive branch manage the operations within the federal government itself. Presidential memoranda are closely related, and have the force of law on the Executive Branch, but are generally considered less prestigious. Presidential memoranda do not have an established process for issuance, and unlike executive orders, they are not numbered. A presidential determination results in an official policy or position of the executive branch of the United States government. A presidential proclamation is a statement issued by a president on a matter of public policy, under specific authority granted to the president by Congress, typically on a matter of widespread interest. Administrative orders are signed documents such as notices, letters, and orders, that can be issued to conduct administrative operations of the federal government. A presidential notice or a presidential sequestration order can also be issued.

Listed below are executive orders numbered 1051–1743 and presidential proclamations signed by United States President William Howard Taft (1909–1913). He issued 724 executive orders. His executive orders are also listed on Wikisource, along with his presidential proclamations.

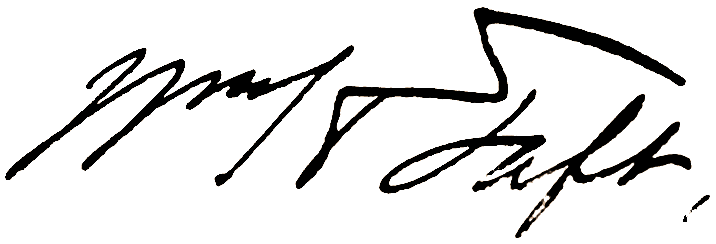
Signature of William Howard Taft

== Executive orders ==
=== 1909 ===
Relative No.	Absolute No.	Title/Description	Date signed
1	1051	Renamed La Salle National Forest, Utah and Colorado, to La Sal National Forest	March 16, 1909
2	1052	Amending Civil Service Rules in Relation to Proposed Employee Transfers	March 23, 1909
3	1053	Authorizing Reinstatement of F. B. Simons as Clerk in Internal Revenue Office	March 24, 1909
4	1054	Lands in Minnesota Previously Reserved at Headwaters of Mississippi River Restored to Public Domain	March 30, 1909
5	1055	Enlarging Parang Military Reservation, Mindanao, Philippine Islands	March 30, 1909
6	1056	Lands in Arkansas Reserved for Operation of Lock and Dam No. 3, Upper White River	March 30, 1909
7	1057	Enlarging Mosquito Inlet Reservation, Florida	April 2, 1909
8	1058	Authorizing Reinstatement of Leonard J. Garver to Position in Classified Service	April 6, 1909
9	1059	Authorizing Reinstatement of Nannie M. Wayland to Position in Classified Service in Treasury Department	April 7, 1909
10	1060	Admission of Deaf-Mutes to Examinations for Civil Service	April 7, 1909
11	1061	Ordering Solicitor General to Report to President on Branding Requirements for Whisky	April 8, 1909
12	1062	Directing Heads of Departments to Comply with Congressional Resolutions Requesting Information When in the Public Interest	April 14, 1909
13	1063	Authorizing Appointment of Archibald S. Pinkett as Clerk in State Department Without Examination	April 16, 1909
14	1064	Authorizing Appointment of Frances M. Marsh as Clerk in State Department Without Examination	April 16, 1909
15	1065	Allowing Incidental Assignment of Laborers to Classified Work	April 21, 1909
16	1066	San Miguel Island, California, reserved for lighthouse purposes	April 23, 1909
17	1067	Redefining Reservation Boundaries of Fort William H. Seward, Chilkat Inlet, Alaska	April 23, 1909
18	1068	Holy Cross National Forest, Colorado, diminished	April 26, 1909
19	1069	Establishing Sopris National Forest, Colorado, from Portion of Holy Cross National Forest	April 26, 1909
20	1070	Reducing Military Reservation on Shaw Island in Washington	May 12, 1909
21	1071	General Supply Committee Created, to Systematize Purchases of Common Supplies for Departments	May 13, 1909
22	1072	Modifying Civil Service Restrictions on Political Activity in Navy Yards	May 14, 1909
23	1073	Authorizing Appointment of Nina L. Carrington to Clerk in Classified Service Without Examination	May 17, 1909
24	1074	Revoking Executive Order of January 19, 1909, Which Appointed the Council of Fine Arts	May 21, 1909
25	1075	Reserving Lands Near Sparta, Wisconsin, for Military Target Range	May 21, 1909
26	1076	Closing Government Offices on Mondays When Certain Holidays Fall on the Preceding Sunday	May 22, 1909
27	1077	Communications and Reports Relative to Certain Territories and Possessions to be Transmitted through the Interior Department	May 25, 1909
28	1078	Authorizing Reinstatement of F. B. Simons as Analytical Chemist in Treasury Department	May 25, 1909
29	1079	Authorizing Appointment of Carl G. Barth as Expert in Shop Management at Watertown Arsenal	May 28, 1909
30	1080	Reducing Portion of Crow Creek Forest Reserve Transferred to War Department for Military Purposes	May 28, 1909
31	1081	Communications and Reports Relative to Indian Territory	June 2, 1909
32	1082	Lands in Arizona Reserved for Coast and Geodetic Survey for Magnetic Observatory	June 3, 1909
33	1083	Tariff of Consular Fees Amended	June 7, 1909
34	1084	Providing That Four Hours on Saturdays During July through September Constitutes a Day's Work for Federal Employees	June 8, 1909
35	1085	Amending Executive Order Providing that Railroad Cars in Canal Zone Be Equipped With Safety Appliances	June 11, 1909
36	1086	Reserving Lands in Rampart, Alaska, for Operation of Military Telegraph Lines	June 15, 1909
37	1087	Authorizing Reinstatement of Hattie M. Miller as Classified Laborer in Patent Office	June 15, 1909
38	1088	EO 1071 Amended to Exclude District of Columbia Government from General Supply Committee	June 16, 1909
39	1089	Reemployment of Repairmen for Interior Department Buildings	June 17, 1909
40	1090	Restoring to Public Domain Certain Lands in Arizona Which Were Reserved for Papago Indians	June 17, 1909
41	1091	Authorizing Reinstatement of George M. Wrattan as Interpreter	June 19, 1909
42	1092	Assistant Attorney General for Interior Dept. Designated to Act as Interior Secretary During Absence of Secretary and First Secretary	June 19, 1909
43	1093	Authorizing Reinstatement of Hattie M. Miller as Skilled Laborer in Patent Office	June 21, 1909
44	1094	Amending Civil Service Rules to Except War Department Cable Electricians from Examination	June 23, 1909
45	1095	Authorizing Appointment of Arthur F. Statter as Special Employee of Treasury Department	June 25, 1909
46	1096	Superseding Executive Order of June 8, 1909, as to Hours of Labor on Saturdays During July-Sept	June 25, 1909
47	1097	Amending Executive Order of May 12, 1909 Regarding Military Reservation on Shaw Island in Washington	June 26, 1909
48	1098	Authorizing Appointment of LeClaire Hoover as Special Agent in Corporations Bureau	June 28, 1909
49	1099	Authorizing Appointment of James M. Alexander as Cashier for Sixth Internal-Revenue District of California	June 28, 1909
50	1100	Permanent Appointment of Temporary Unclassified Laborers in the Customs Service in New York	June 28, 1909
51	1101	Authorizing Appointment of John R. Bowie as Publicity Agent in Soils Bureau	June 29, 1909
52	1102	Amending Civil Service Rules Regarding Exceptions for Temporary Acting Assistant Surgeons	June 29, 1909
53	1103	Authorizing Classification of Certain Unclassified Watchmen in the Customs Service	June 29, 1909
54	1104	Authorizing Appointment of Edward S. Hoskins as Indexer in Agriculture Department	June 29, 1909
55	1105	Enlarging Military Reservation on Batan and Cacraray Islands, Philippine Islands	July 1, 1909
56	1106	Transferring Portion of Fort Ruger Military Reservation in Oahu to Government of Territory of Hawaii for Reservoir Site	July 1, 1909
57	1107	Surgeon General of Marine Hospital Service Directed to Inspect Sanitary Conditions in Government Buildings	July 3, 1909
58	1108	Regulations Governing Employment of Unskilled Laborers Outside Washington, D.C.	July 3, 1909
59	1109	Amending Civil Service Rules to Except Superintendent of Construction, Corregidor, Philippine Island, from Examination	July 9, 1909
60	1110	Placing Government of Porto Rico Under the War Department	July 15, 1909
61	1111	Ordering that Executive Orders No. 1084 of June 8 and 1096 of June 25, 1909, are Not Applicable on the Isthmus of Panama	July 16, 1909
62	1112	Authorizing Appointment of C. O. Kerr as Confidential Clerk to Land Defense Board at Fort Wadsworth, N. Y.	July 19, 1909
63	1113	Paragraphs 114, 115, 120, and 129 of Consular Regulations of 1896, Regarding Communications, Amended	July 20, 1909
64	1114	Transferring Oilers in Quartermaster's Department to Competitive Classified Service	July 28, 1909
65	1115	Amending Sec. 149 of the Laws of the Canal Zone, Concerning Penalties for Murder in the First Degree	July 30, 1909
66	1116	Providing for Diminution of Time from Sentences of Certain Convicts in the Canal Zone	July 30, 1909
67	1117	Authorizing Leave for Grand Army of the Republic Members Employed by Government to Attend National Encampment in Salt Lake City	July 30, 1909
68	1118	Permitting State and County Officials to Accept Appointments to Census Bureau as Special Agents for Collection of Cotton Statistics	August 4, 1909
69	1119	Authorizing Classification of Certain Unclassified Laborers in the Customs Service	August 5, 1909
70	1120	Time Limit for Completion of Work of Spanish Treaty Claims Commission Extended to March 2, 1910.	August 6, 1909
71	1121	Amending Civil Service Rules to Except More General Land Office Special Agents from Examination	August 6, 1909
72	1122	Excusing Federal Employees From Work on Labor Day	August 27, 1909
73	1123	Lands in Minnesota Reserved by Proclamation 957 in 1892, Restored to Public Domain Subject to Overflow Rights	August 27, 1909
74	1124	Enlarging Target Range at Fort Russell, Wyoming	August 27, 1909
75	1125	Crook National Forest, Arizona, Diminished	August 27, 1909
76	1126	Amending Sec 454 of Act 14 of the Laws of the Canal Zone, Concerning Hunting in the Canal Zone	September 8, 1909
77	1127	Amending Civil Service Rules to Allow Appointment of Messenger Boys Without Charge to Apportionment	September 18, 1909
78	1128	Amending Civil Service Rules to Except Employees at Leprosy Investigation Station, Molokai, Hawaii, from Examination	September 24, 1909
79	1129	Reducing Hot Springs Military Reservation in Alaska	September 27, 1909
80	1130	Amending the Laws of the Canal Zone Concerning Cruelty to Children and Animals	October 2, 1909
81	1131	Ordering the Isthmian Canal Commission to Appoint a Board of Local Inspectors	October 2, 1909
82	1132	Ordering Expenses for Tariff Board Paid from Appropriation from Urgent Deficiency Act	October 3, 1909
83	1133	Biorka Island, Sitka Sound, Alaska, Reserved as Naval Wireless Telegraph Station	October 19, 1909
84	1134	Transferring Military Reservation in Sangley Point, Luzon, Philippine Islands, to Navy Department	October 19, 1909
85	1135	Transferring Certain Lands in Chehalis Indian Reservation to Perry Yukton	November 11, 1909
86	1136	Lands in Arizona Reserved as Rifle Range for Organized Militia of Territory of Arizona	November 13, 1909
87	1137	Redefining Boundaries of Schofield Barracks Military Reservation in Hawaii	November 15, 1909
88	1138	Authorizing Reinstatement of Fred V. Murphy as Architectural Draftsman in Office of Supervising Architect of the Treasury	November 22, 1909
89	1139	Enlarging Camp Jossman Military Reservation, Guimaras, Philippine Islands	November 22, 1909
90	1140	Limiting Hours of Service of All Telegraph or Telephone Employees of the Panama Railroad	November 23, 1909
91	1141	Providing that Any Person Who Shall Induce Workmen of the Canal Zone to Break Contracts Shall Be Fined or Imprisoned	November 23, 1909
92	1142	Influencing Legislation by Employees of the United States or Military Officers Stationed in Washington	November 26, 1909
93	1143	Regulations Governing Appointments and Promotions in Diplomatic Service	November 26, 1909
94	1144	Authorizing Appointment of James B. Davies as Clerk in State Department	December 6, 1909
95	1145	Amending Regulations Governing Promotions in Consular Service Regarding Composition of Board of Examiners	December 8, 1909
96	1146	Amending Civil Service Rules to Except Chief Law Officer in the Reclamation Service from Examination	December 10, 1909
97	1147	Additionally Reserving Wichita National Forest Lands for Protection of Water Supply of Fort Sill, Oklahoma	December 15, 1909
98	1148	Permanent Appointment of Two Temporary Unclassified Laborers in the Customs Service in New York	December 21, 1909
99	1149	Permitting Temporary Employment of Machinists, Tool Makers, Electricians, and Apprentice Boys by the Census Bureau Without Examination	December 29, 1909
100	1150	Permitting Certain Immigration Commission Employees to be Temporarily Employed by the Census Bureau	December 29, 1909

=== 1910 ===
Relative No.	Absolute No.	Title/Description	Date signed
101	1151	Amending Civil Service Rules to Except Chief Post-Office Inspector from Examination	January 4, 1910
102	1152	Authorizing Reinstatement of Hattie M. Hodes in Government Printing Office	January 7, 1910
103	1153	Procedure in Submitting Recommendations Relative to Appointment in Classified Service	January 12, 1910
104	1154	Military Reservations Restored to Government of the Philippine Islands	January 13, 1910
105	1155	Authorizing Reinstatement of Henry S. Graves in Forest Service	January 13, 1910
106	1156	Authorizing Reinstatement of Lillie Pratt in Government Printing Office Without Regard to Civil Service Rules	January 20, 1910
107	1157	Authorizing Reinstatement of John N. Parsons as Letter Carrier in Postal Service Without Regard to Civil Service Rules	January 27, 1910
108	1158	Authorizing Canal Commission to Construct Sanitary Improvements and to Charge Proportion of Cost to Owners of Adjacent Property	January 26, 1910
109	1159	Authorizing Reinstatement of Nannie M. Wayland as Clerk Without Regard to Civil Service Rules	January 27, 1910
110	1160	Authorizing Appointment of J. F. Boepple as Shell Expert in Bureau of Fisheries Without Examination	January 31, 1910
111	1161	Consular Regulations of 1896, Paragraph 35, Regarding Penalty Bonds, Amended	February 3, 1910
112	1162	Authorizing Reinstatement of John H. Dickinson as Inspector in Quartermaster's Department of the Army Without Regard to Civil Service Rules	February 4, 1910
113	1163	Amending Civil Service Rules to Except Statutory Places of Secretary in National Military Parks from Examination	February 8, 1910
114	1164	Lands in Standing Rock Indian Reservation, South Dakota, Transferred to Lemmon Land District	February 8, 1910
115	1165	Lands in Standing Rock and Cheyenne Indian Reservations, South Dakota, Transferred to Aberdeen Land District	February 8, 1910
116	1166	Lands in Standing Rock Indian Reservation, North Dakota, Transferred from Bismarck Land District to Lemmon Land District	February 8, 1910
117	1167	Time Limit for Completion of Work of Spanish Treaty Claims Commission Extended to May 2, 1910	February 9, 1910
118	1168	Authorizing Reinstatement of John G. Curran in Assistant Custodian and Janitor Service Without Regard to Civil Service Rules	February 15, 1910
119	1169	Lands in Arizona Reserved as Rifle Range for National Guard of Arizona	February 15, 1910
120	1170	Lands in Bismarck Land District, North Dakota, Transferred to Fargo Land District; Revoked by EO 1182	February 21, 1910
121	1171	Lands in Missoula Land District, Montana, Transferred to Kalispell Land District	February 25, 1910
122	1172	Restoring to Public Domain Certain Lands in Mescalero Apache Indian Reservation	March 1, 1910
123	1173	Amendment of Executive Order No. 980 of November 25, 1908, Establishing Limits of Punishment for Enlisted Men of the Army	March 3, 1910
124	1174	Authorizing Reinstatement of Henry Bartalot as Marine Engineer in Quartermaster's Department at Large Without Regard to Civil Service Rules	March 7, 1910
125	1175	Enlarging Kaakaukukui Reef Military Reservation in Hawaii	March 12, 1910
126	1176	Amending Civil Service Rules to Permit Wife of Competitive Employee at Indian School to take Noncompetitive Examination	March 12, 1910
127	1177	Authorizing Reinstatement of James A. Compton, William E. Dulin, and George P. Meyer in Pension Office Without Regard to Civil Service Rules	March 15, 1910
128	1178	Lands in Oregon, Reserved for War Dept. for Improvement of Coos Bay and Harbor, Restored to Public Domain	March 23, 1910
129	1179	Amending Civil Service Rules To Except Temporary Histopathologist from Examination	March 23, 1910
130	1180	Amending Civil Service Rules Regarding Noncompetitive Examinations	March 23, 1910
131	1181	Naval Reservation at Punchbowl Slope, Honolulu, Hawaii, Transferred to Agriculture Dept.	March 25, 1910
132	1182	EO 1170 Revoked	March 25, 1910
133	1182½	Authority of Unnumbered EO of Feb. 2, 1904 for Commerce and Labor Sec'y to Reserve Alaska Lands for Propagation of Foxes, Extended to Allow Reservation for Propagation of Other Fur-Bearing Animals	March 25, 1910
134	1183	El Reno Land Office, Okla., Abolished; Transferred to Guthrie Land Office	March 30, 1910
135	1184	Providing that Moneys Paid for Liquor Licenses in Canal Zone be Collected by Collector of Revenues	April 2, 1910
136	1185	Amending Civil Service Rules Regarding Exceptions from Examination in Treasury Department	April 4, 1910
137	1186	Reserving Lands in Alaska for War Department for Defensive Purposes	April 8, 1910
138	1187	Lands in Arizona Reserved for Target Range for National Guard of Arizona	April 9, 1910
139	1188	Appointing Maurice H. Thatcher as Member of Isthmian Canal Commission	April 12, 1910
140	1189	Amending Civil Service Rules to Except Assistant Secretary at Chickamauga and Chattanooga National Military Park Commission from Examination	April 12, 1910
141	1190	Defining Duties of Counsel and Chief Attorney for the Isthmian Canal Commission	April 16, 1910
142	1191	Authorizing Appointment of Collinson Lewis Warwick as Nautical Expert in Coast and Geodetic Survey Without Examination	April 18, 1910
143	1192	Portion of Former Crow Creek Forest Reserve Fully Transferred to War Department for Target and Maneuver Purposes	April 19, 1910
144	1193	Reserving Land in Beaver Dam, Alaska, for Use by Army Signal Corps in Operation of Telegraph Lines	April 26, 1910
145	1194	Six Tracts of Land in Alaska Reserved for Educational Purposes	April 26, 1910
146	1195	Authorizing Appointment of 25 Clerks in Post Office Department for Employees Previously Transferred from Bureau of Printing and Engraving	April 28, 1910
147	1196	Amending Civil Service Rules Regarding Method of Certification	April 28, 1910
148	1197	Reserving Land in Cotabato, Moro Province, Philippine Islands, for Military Purposes	April 28, 1910
149	1198	Appointing Board to Study and Make Recommendations Regarding System of Telegraphy in Philippine Islands	April 30, 1910
150	1199	Lester M. Spier, Executive Sec'y of Tariff Board, Authorized to Approve Payment Vouchers in Absence of Chairman or Acting Chairman	May 5, 1910
151	1200	Tariff Board Members, Travelling on Official Business, Allowed $15 Per Diem Expenses	May 5, 1910
152	1201	Henry C. Emery, James B. Reynolds, Alvin H. Sanders Appointed Tariff Board Special Disbursing Agents	May 5, 1910
153	1202	Authorizing Appointment of French Government Engineers in Engineer Department at Large Without Examination	May 6, 1910
154	1203	Authorizing Appointment of Helen M. Bullis as Special Inspectress in Immigration Service Without Examination	May 11, 1910
155	1204	Authorizing Appointment of Henry Suberkrup as Guard and Musical Instructor in United States Penitentiary, Leavenworth, Kansas, Without Examination	May 12, 1910
156	1205	Amending Executive Order of April 26, 1910, Reserving Land in Beaver Dam, Alaska, for Use by Army Signal Corps in Operation of Telegraph Lines	May 13, 1910
157	1206	Defining Boundaries of Gasparilla Island and Cayo Costa Military Reservations in Florida	May 27, 1910
158	1207	Lands in Columbia River, Wash., Reserved for Use By War Dept. for Improvement of River	May 27, 1910
159	1208	Directing Officials in all Branches of Government to Provide Tariff Board Access to Needed Information	June 7, 1910
160	1209	Santa Barbara National Forest, California, Enlarged by Adding All Lands of San Luis National Forest	June 8, 1910
161	1210	EO 9 Waived to Allow State and Local Officials to Accept Appointments at Census Bureau for Collection of Statistics Data	June 13, 1910
162	1211	Lands of Yakima Indian Reservation, Formerly Part of Walla Walla and Vancouver Land Districts, Transferred to North Yakima Land District	June 13, 1910
163	1212	Unsurveyed Island in Columbia River, Oregon, Reserved for War Dept. As Site for Marine Ways for Improvement of Upper Columbia River	June 22, 1910
164	1213	Additionally Reserving Portion of Gila National Forest for Protection of Water Supply of Fort Bayard in New Mexico	June 22, 1910
165	1214	Authorizing Reinstatement of Louise M. Foster as Laborer in Department of Agriculture Without Regard to Civil Service Rules	June 22, 1910
166	1215	Transferring Naval Reservations in Cebu and Isabela de Basilan and Polloc, Philippine Islands, to War Department	June 17, 1910
167	1216	Reserving Lands in Montana for Military Purposes to Protect Big Hole Battlefield Monument	June 23, 1910
168	1217	Amending Paragraph 684 of Consular Regulations Regarding Samples of Goods	July 1, 1910
169	1218	Amending Civil Service Rules to Except Specialist in Bureau of Education from Examination	July 1, 1910
170	1219	Authorizing Appointment of Editor in Bureau of Education Without Examination	July 1, 1910
171	1220	Adding Lands to Duck Valley Indian Reservation	July 1, 1910
172	1221	Reserving Lands in New Mexico as Reservation for Pueblo Indians Belonging to Pueblo Laguna	July 1, 1910
173	1222	Agricultural Experiment Station in Arizona Enlarged to Enable Completion of Experiments	July 1, 1910
174	1223	Authorizing Reinstatement of Capt. J. W. Powell as Clerk in Government Printing Office Without Regard to Civil Service Rules	July 2, 1910
175	1224	Partially Revoking Executive Order of August 25, 1877 which Reserved Lands in California for Indian Use	July 7, 1910
176	1225	Amending Civil Service Rules to Except Certain Laborers in Customs Service, District of Hawaii, from Examination	July 12, 1910
177	1226	Authorizing Retention of Certain Recently-Employed Agents in Interior Department in Classified Service	July 12, 1910
178	1227	Rescinding Executive Order No. 310-C of March 22, 1905, Reserving Lands for Flowage Purposes in Maintenance of Reservoirs at Headwaters of Mississippi River	July 12, 1910
179	1228	Public Lands Within Siletz Indian Reservation, Oregon, Temporarily Withdrawn for Classification and Pending Legislation	July 13, 1910
180	1229	Transferring Portion of Cordova Bay Military Reservation in Alaska to Navy Department	July 15, 1910
181	1230	Authorizing Isthmian Canal Commission to Establish Rules and Regulations to Protect Works of Excavation, Dredging, and Other Canal Construction	July 25, 1910
182	1231	Concerning Civil Actions in Courts of the Canal Zone in Cases which Parties are Alien Nonresidents	July 28, 1910
183	1232	Lands Withdrawn Pending Legislation to Grant Tract to City of Tillamock for Waterway Purposes	July 28, 1910
184	1233	Authorizing Appointment of Charles W. Fowle as Clerk in Department of State Without Examination	July 28, 1910
185	1234	Boundaries of Lincoln Land District, New Mexico, Redefined	August 4, 1910
186	1235	Authorizing Reinstatement of Robert T. Frazier in Patent Office Without Regard to Civil Service Rules	August 8, 1910
187	1236	Authorizing Placement of John J. Scully as Classified Laborer in Customs Service Without Regard to Civil Service Rules	August 8, 1910
188	1237	Lands on Cordova Point, Prince William Sound, Alaska, Reserved for Naval Purposes	August 15, 1910
189	1238	Lands in Arizona Reserved as Rifle Range for National Guard of Arizona	August 20, 1910
190	1239	Conveyance of Real Estate by Married Women in the Canal Zone	August 20, 1910
191	1240	Amending Civil Service Rules Regarding Exceptions from Examination in Treasury Department	August 20, 1910
192	1241	Lands in Colorado Withdrawn Pending Legislation to Grant Tract to National Lincoln Douglas Sanatorium and Consumptives' Hospital Association	August 23, 1910
193	1242	Enlarging Schofield Barracks Military Reservation in Hawaii	August 23, 1910
194	1243	Excusing Federal Employees From Work on Labor Day	August 24, 1910
195	1244	EO 1234 Revoked; New Boundaries for Lincoln Land District Established	September 2, 1910
196	1245	Authorizing Placement of Twenty-Nine Laborers on Classified List in Customs Service Without Regard to Civil Service Rules	September 14, 1910
197	1246	Amending Civil Service Rules Regarding Transfers from Isthmus of Panama	September 16, 1910
198	1247	Amending Civil Service Rules Regarding Exceptions from Examination in Forest Service	September 24, 1910
199	1248	Transferring Hawkins Island Naval Reservation in Alaska to War Department	September 26, 1910
200	1249	Making Certain Positions in First and Second Class Post Offices Subject to Civil Service Examination	September 30, 1910
201	1250	Abolishing the Position of Tax Collector, Creating the Position of Deputy Collector of Revenues, and Amending the Laws Governing Taxes, etc., in the Canal Zone	October 4, 1910
202	1251	Portion of Lemmon Land District, North Dakota, Transferred to Bismarck Land District	October 4, 1910
203	1252	Portion of Lemmon Land District, North Dakota, Transferred to Dickinson Land District	October 4, 1910
204	1253	To Prescribe the Manner of Leasing Public Lands in the Canal Zone	October 7, 1910
205	1254	Lands at Baguio, Benguet, Luzon, Philippine Islands, Reserved for Naval Hospital and Other Naval Purposes	October 10, 1910
206	1255	Lands in Arizona Reserved for Use of National Guard of Arizona	October 13, 1910
207	1256	Adding Lands to the Salt River Indian Reservation	October 20, 1910
208	1257	Further Reserving Lands in Gila National Forest, New Mexico, to Protect Water Supply of Fort Bayard	October 22, 1910
209	1258	Authorizing Appointment of W. E. S. Griswold as Secretary of Investigative Commission Without Regard to Civil Service Rules	October 25, 1910
210	1259	Ordering that All Public Buildings to be Erected in District of Columbia Be Submitted to Commission of Fine Arts for Advice	October 25, 1910
211	1260	Restoring Portion of Chugach National Forest, Alaska, to the Public Domain	October 28, 1910
212	1261	Transferring Portion of Fort Ruger Military Reservation in Hawaii to the Commerce and Labor Department for Lighthouse Purposes	October 31, 1910
213	1262	Lands in New Mexico Further Reserved as Rifle Range for National Guard of New Mexico	November 2, 1910
214	1263	Authorizing Permanent Appointment of William J. Meyers as Statistician in Interstate Commerce Commission Without Examination	November 4, 1910
215	1264	Authorizing Reinstatement of Mary A. Wells as Clerk in Bureau of the Census Without Regard to Civil Service Rules	November 7, 1910
216	1265	Transferring Lands from Mono National Forest, Nevada to Toiyabe National Forest	November 25, 1910
217	1265½	Constituting the Internal Revenue District of Oklahoma	November 25, 1910
218	1266	Authorizing Civil Service Commission to Except Certain Unusual Positions from Examination	December 1, 1910
219	1267	Fort Mojave Indian Reservation	December 1, 1910
220	1268	Amending Civil Service Rules Regarding Exceptions from Examination in Navy Department	December 2, 1910
221	1269	Members of Certain Organizations Employed by Government in District of Columbia Excused from Duty on Dec. 7, 1910, for Unveiling of Statue of Baron Frederick von Steuben	December 6, 1910
222	1270	Authorizing Reinstatement of Charles M. Irelan as Clerk in War Department Without Regard to Civil Service Rules	December 12, 1910
223	1271	Adding Lands to Coeur d'Alene Reservation	December 13, 1910
224	1272	Thomas W. Brahany, Executive Sec'y of Tariff Board, Authorized to Approve Fund Requisitions in Absence of Chairman or Acting Chairman	December 12, 1910
225	1273	Authorizing Reinstatement of Edward K. Ketchum as Letter Carrier in Philadelphia Post Office Without Regard to Civil Service Rules	December 16, 1910
226	1274	Communications and Reports Relative to Guam and Samoa to be Transmitted through the Secretary of the Navy	December 20, 1910
227	1275	Authorizing Transfer of Furloughed Lighthouse Service Employees Without Regard to Civil Service Rules	December 20, 1910
228	1276	Lands in New Mexico, Idaho, and Colorado, Previously Reserved as Administrative Sites for Lincoln, Pocatello, Las Animas, and San Isabel National Forests, Restored to Settlement and Entry	December 23, 1910
229	1277	Prohibiting Government Employees from Instructing Persons for Examinations for Diplomatic Services	December 23, 1910

=== 1911 ===
Relative No.	Absolute No.	Title/Description	Date signed
230	1278	Authorizing Appointment of Florence G. Miller as Clerk in Classified Service Without Regard to Civil Service Rules	January 4, 1911
231	1279	Abolishing Fort Ringgold Military Reservation, Texas	January 4, 1911
232	1280	Transferring New Orleans, Louisiana, Land Office to Baton Rouge	January 6, 1911
233	1281	Natchitoches Land District, Louisiana, Abolished and Land, Business and Archives Pertaining Thereto, Transferred to Baton Rouge Land District	January 6, 1911
234	1282	Restoring Biliran Island Military Reservation to Government of Philippine Islands	January 10, 1911
235	1283	Prescribing Schedule for Army Rations	January 11, 1911
236	1284	Restoring to Public Domain Certain Lands in Navajo Indian Reservation	January 16, 1911
237	1285	Authorizing Use of French Dump Cars in Canal Zone Without Safety Appliances	January 16, 1911
238	1286	To Create a Land Office for the Canal Zone and for Other Purposes	January 19, 1911
239	1287	Restoring to Public Domain Certain Described Lands in Minnesota	January 24, 1911
240	1288	Authorizing Appointment of George T. Weitzel and Willing Spencer as Clerks in Department of State Without Examination	January 26, 1911
241	1289	Amending Civil Service Rules to Except Navy Positions on Guam from Examination	January 26, 1911
242	1290	Amending Civil Service Rules Regarding Noncompetitive Examinations of Miners	January 30, 1911
243	1291	Lands in Minnesota Reserved for Proposed Improvement of Zippel Bay	January 30, 1911
244	1292	Richardson Rock, Island Off of California, Reserved for Lighthouse Purposes	January 30, 1911
245	1293	Authorizing Reinstatement of Archibald Edmonstone as Assistant Weigher in Customs Service Without Regard to Civil Service Rules	January 30, 1911
246	1294	Authorizing Appointment of Edith F. Spofford as Clerk in Bureau of Mines Without Regard to Civil Service Rules	January 30, 1911
247	1295	To Provide a Method of Executing and Recording Deeds, and to Repeal the Executive Order Dated March 12, 1907, Effective April 15, 1907, Relating to the Same Subject	February 2, 1911
248	1296	Fort Mojave Indian Reservation	February 2, 1911
249	1297	Reserving lands in Idaho for Protection of Water Supply of Boise Barracks, Fort Boise	February 13, 1911
250	1298	Reservations of Lands in the Philippine Islands	February 13, 1911
251	1299	Ordering Lands Ceded by Pillager Band of Chippewa Indians No Longer Held as Indian Land	February 16, 1911
252	1300	Authorizing Sales of Liquor on Lands Ceded by Red Lake and Pembina Bands of Chippewa Indians	February 16, 1911
253	1301	Authorizing Sales of Liquor on Lands Ceded by Chippewa Indians of Lake Superior	February 16, 1911
254	1302	Authorizing Sales of Liquor on Minnesota Lands Ceded by Wahpeton and Sisseton Bands of Sioux Indians	February 16, 1911
255	1303	Appointment of Commander Richard H. Jackson to Wireless Telegraphy Board	February 18, 1911
256	1304	Certain Lands in Florida, Reserved for Lighthouse Purposes, Restored to Public Domain	February 18, 1911
257	1305	Land Office for Aberdeen Land District, South Dakota, Transferred to Timber Lake	February 18, 1911
258	1306	Portion of Waterville Land District, Washington, Transferred to North Yakima Land District	February 20, 1911
259	1307	Amending Civil Service Rules to Except Navy Positions on Samoa from Examination	February 21, 1911
260	1308	Fox Administrative Site Established for Ozark National Forest, Arizona	February 21, 1911
261	1309	Authorizing Reinstatement of William E. Lewis in Government Printing Office Without Regard to Civil Service Rules	February 25, 1911
262	1310	Authorizing Reinstatement of Nathan C. Grover as Chief Engineer in United States Geological Survey Without Regard to Civil Service Rules	February 27, 1911
263	1311	Certain Lands in Florida, Reserved for Lighthouse Purposes, Restored to Public Domain; Executive Order 1304 Superseded	March 1, 1911
264	1312	Tariff Board Created, Members Named, and Duties Prescribed	March 4, 1911
265	1313	Designating Martin A. Knapp as Chairman of Interstate Commerce Commission	March 4, 1911
266	1314	Portion of Humboldt National Forest, Nevada, Restored to Public Domain	March 8, 1911
267	1315	Certain Lands in Arizona Reserved as Target Range for Use by National Guard	March 14, 1911
268	1316	Certain Lands in Juneau, Alaska, Reserved as Site for Mansion and Museum Building	March 14, 1911
269	1317	Land Office for San Francisco Land District, California, Transferred from Oakland to San Francisco	March 14, 1911
270	1318	Lands in Minnesota, Reserved for Flowage Purposes Regarding Reservoir Construction at Mississippi River Headwaters, Restored to Public Domain	March 14, 1911
271	1319	Appointing Walter W. Warwick Associate Justice of the Supreme Court of the Canal Zone	March 16, 1911
272	1320	Appointing Thomas E. Brown, Jr., Associate Justice of the Supreme Court of the Canal Zone	March 16, 1911
273	1321	Authorizing Retention of Five Panama Railroad Employees in Classified Service	March 20, 1911
274	1322	Pima and Maricopa Indian Reservation	March 22, 1911
275	1323	Big Pine Administrative Site, California, Created for Inyo National Forest	March 24, 1911
276	1324	Long Pine Administrative Site, California, Created for Kern National Forest	March 24, 1911
277	1324½	Reserving All Public Lands in Alaska Containing Hot Springs for Public Purposes	March 28, 1911
278	1325	Stony Ford Administrative Site, California, Created for California National Forest	March 29, 1911
279	1326	Hornbrook Administrative Site, California, Created for Klamath National Forest	March 29, 1911
280	1327	Apex Administrative Site, California, Created for Lassen National Forest	April 3, 1911
281	1328	Amending Civil Service Rules to Except Certain Marine Corps Clerks from Examination	April 3, 1911
282	1329	Authorizing Reinstatement of W. E. Shields in Government Printing Office Without Regard to Civil Service Rules	April 4, 1911
283	1330	Abolishing Powder House Lot Military Reservation, Florida	April 10, 1911
284	1331	Certain Lands at Juneau, Alaska, Reserved as Site for Mansion and Museum building; EO 445 and EO 1316 Amended	April 11, 1911
285	1332	Establishing Clear Lake Reservation, California, as Preserve and Breeding Ground for Birds	April 11, 1911
286	1333	Amending Army Limits of Punishment Regarding Loaning Money at Usurious Rates of Interest	April 14, 1911
287	1334	Authorizing Reinstatement of Mary E. Gunion in Government Printing Office Without Regard to Civil Service Rules	April 15, 1911
288	1335	Authorizing Appointment of Six Agents to Internal Revenue Service Without Regard to Civil Service Rules	April 17, 1911
289	1336	Mokelumne (E) Administrative Site, California, Created for Stanislaus National Forest	April 19, 1911
290	1337	Round Valley Administrative Site, Arizona, Created for Apache National Forest	April 19, 1911
291	1338	Reserving Lands in Cotabato, Moro Province, Philippine Islands, for Military Purposes	April 20, 1911
292	1339	Amending Civil Service Rules Regarding Retransfers to Former Positions	April 21, 1911
293	1340	Amending Civil Service Rules to Except Assistant to Secretary of the Interior from Examination	April 21, 1911
294	1341	Lands in New Mexico, Within Gila National Forest, Reserved to Protect Water Supply of Fort Bayard	April 24, 1911
295	1342	Authorizing Reinstatement of Ralph R. Mulcare as Letter Carrier Without Regard to Civil Service Rules	April 24, 1911
296	1343	Bloomfield Administrative Site, California, Created for Tahoe National Forest	April 28, 1911
297	1344	Authorizing Reinstatement of Leroy T. Steward as Superintendent at Chicago Post Office Without Regard to Civil Service Rules	April 29, 1911
298	1345	Prohibiting Deported Persons from Returning to the Canal Zone	May 2, 1911
299	1346	Lands in Montana, Formerly Part of Fort Shaw Indian School, Reserved for Use by Reclamation Service	May 2, 1911
300	1347	Reserving Lands in Valdez, Alaska, for Operation of Military Telegraph Lines	May 6, 1911
301	1348	Relating to the Arrest and Discharge of Deserting Seamen in the Canal Zone	May 6, 1911
302	1349	Gila River Reservation	May 8, 1911
303	1350	Authorizing Appointment of John Roche and Patrick McKeefrey as Watchmen in Customs Service Without Regard to Civil Service Rules	May 10, 1911
304	1351	Government of the Insane Asylum for the Canal Zone	May 10, 1911
305	1352	Prohibiting Evasion of Fare on Railway Trains in Canal Zone	May 10, 1911
306	1353	To Provide for the Collection of a Distillation Tax	May 13, 1911
307	1354	Baker Administrative Site, Near Nevada National Forest, Nevada	May 16, 1911
308	1355	Box Springs Administrative Site, California, Created for Angeles National Forest	May 16, 1911
309	1356	Lands in Idaho Reserved as Rifle Range for National Guard	May 16, 1911
310	1357	Mokelumne (W) Administrative Site, California, Created for Stanislaus National Forest	May 22, 1911
311	1358	Authorizing Transfer of John E. Wilkie to Supervisor in Treasury Department Without Regard to Civil Service Rules	May 22, 1911
312	1359	Reserving Land in New Mexico for Indian Purposes	May 24, 1911
313	1360	Authorizing Appointment of Mary E. Gunion to Clerical Grade Position Without Regard to Civil Service Rules	May 25, 1911
314	1361	Restoring Certain Lands in Valdez, Alaska, to Public Domain	May 26, 1911
315	1362	Enlarging Fort Armstrong Military Reservation, Kaakaukukui Reef, Honolulu, Hawaii	May 26, 1911
316	1363	Amending Civil Service Rules Regarding Post Office Positions	May 26, 1911
317	1364	Enlarging Torrey Barracks Military Reservation, Malabang, Mindanao, Philippine Islands	May 29, 1911
318	1365	Authorizing Retention of James B. Horigan in Forest Service Without Regard to Civil Service Rules	May 29, 1911
319	1366	Authorizing Appointment of George E. Pickett as Clerk in War Department Without Regard to Civil Service Rules	May 31, 1911
320	1367	Fort Wingate Military Reservation, New Mexico, Made Part of Zuni National Forest	May 31, 1911
321	1368	Reserving Land in Arizona for Use of Walapai Indians	June 2, 1911
322	1369	Silver Creek Administrative Site, South Dakota, Created for Black Hills National Forest	June 2, 1911
323	1370	Authorizing Reinstatement of I. C. Faulk as Storekeeper-Gauger in Internal Revenue Service Without Regard to Civil Service Rules	June 9, 1911
324	1371	Amending Civil Service Rules Regarding Treasury Department Examination Exceptions	June 12, 1911
325	1372	Amending Effective Date of Collection of Distillation Tax	June 12, 1911
326	1373	Mad River Administrative Site, California, Created for Trinity National Forest	June 16, 1911
327	1374	Reserving Lands for Benefit of Papago Indians	June 16, 1911
328	1375	Indian Administrative Site, Utah, Created for Fillmore National Forest	June 26, 1911
329	1376	Authorizing Appointment of Five Deputy Auditors to Classified Service Without Regard to Civil Service Rules	June 26, 1911
330	1377	Reserving Certain Described Lands in Hawaii for Military Purposes; Fort Ruger Military Reservation, Diamond Head, Oahu, T.H.	June 26, 1911
331	1378	Bennett Administrative Site, California, Created for California National Forest	June 28, 1911
332	1379	Reserving Lands in Southern Florida as Reservation for Seminole Indians	June 28, 1911
333	1380	Authorizing Chairman and Chief Engineer of Canal Zone to Issue Revocable Licenses for Townsite Lots	June 28, 1911
334	1381	Authorizing William T. Thompson, Treasury Solicitor, to Temporarily Act in Place of Fletcher Maddox, Internal Revenue Solicitor	June 28, 1911
335	1382	State Dept. Employees Forbidden to Furnish Information Regarding Moneys Related to Section 291 of Revised Statues Except to Authorized Officials	July 7, 1911
336	1383	Authorizing Reinstatement of Henry M. Camp Without Regard to Civil Service Rules	July 7, 1911
337	1384	Austin Administrative Site, Nevada, Created for Toiyabe National Forest	July 10, 1911
338	1385	Authorizing Reinstatement of Charles L. Dooley Without Regard to Civil Service Rules	July 14, 1911
339	1386	Providing for the Inspection of Steam Vessels	July 21, 1911
340	1387	Gila River Indian Reservation	July 31, 1911
341	1388	Authorizing Appointment of Thomas Richardson Without Examination	July 31, 1911
342	1389	Abolishing Fort Niobrara Military Reservation	August 1, 1911
343	1390	Authorizing Sylvester P. Bartlett to Hold Position in Illinois State Fish Commission Without Regard to Executive Order of January 17, 1873	August 2, 1911
344	1391	Authorizing Transfer of Charles B. Bateman to Mechanical Position in Classified Service	August 2, 1911
345	1392	Against the Promotion of Fights between Bulls, Dogs, or Cocks	August 4, 1911
346	1393	Lincoln Rock, Clarence Strait, Alaska, Reserved for Lighthouse Purposes	August 4, 1911
347	1394	Authorizing Appointment of Interstate Commerce Commission Secretary Without Regard to Civil Service Rules	August 9, 1911
348	1395	Authorizing Reinstatement of Lilly Dent Rogers as Clerk in Treasury Department Without Regard to Civil Service Rules	August 9, 1911
349	1396	Authorizing Reinstatement of Randolph Fortune as Messenger in War Department Without Regard to Civil Service Rules	August 9, 1911
350	1397	Abolishing Fort Grant Military Reservation	August 10, 1911
351	1398	Nogales Administrative Site, Arizona, Created for Coranado National Forest	August 15, 1911
352	1399	Lawton Land District, Oklahoma, Abolished; Transferred to Guthrie Land District	August 17, 1911
353	1400	Hole-In-The-Rock Administrative Site, Utah, Created for Ashley National Forest	August 17, 1911
354	1401	Emma Administrative Site, Colorado, Created for Sopris National Forest	August 18, 1911
355	1402	Authorizing Transfer of Norris R. Welsh to Department of Agriculture Without Regard to Civil Service Rules	August 21, 1911
356	1403	Authorizing Appointment of Edwin L. Williams as Clerk in Post Office Department Without Regard to Civil Service Rules	August 22, 1911
357	1404	Excusing Federal Employees From Work on Labor Day	August 25, 1911
358	1405	Sapinero Administrative Site, Colorado, Created for Gunnison National Forest	August 25, 1911
359	1406	Amending Executive Order Reserving Lands in New Mexico for Use by Indians of Jemez Pueblo	September 1, 1911
360	1407	Amending EO 574, Regarding Rules and Regulations for Army and Navy General Hospital, Hot Springs, Arkansas	September 1, 1911
361	1408	Amending Civil Service Rules Regarding Exceptions from Examination for Commercial Agents	September 4, 1911
362	1409	Establishing the Postal Savings System in the Canal Zone	September 8, 1911
363	1410	To Prohibit the Placing of Signs on Lands and Property of the United States and the Panama Railroad Company	September 8, 1911
364	1411	Pasay Barracks Reservation Restored to Control of Government of Philippine Islands	September 13, 1911
365	1412	Removal of Packing or Waste from Journal Boxes of Railroad Equipment	September 14, 1911
366	1413	Appointing William H. Jackson Associate Justice of the Supreme Court of the Canal Zone	September 21, 1911
367	1414	To Amend Sections 51, 62, and 526, and to Repeal Sections 63 and 529 of the Code of Civil Procedure of the Canal Zone	September 26, 1911
368	1415	Lands in South Dakota Reserved for Dry Land Agricultural Experiments by Agriculture Department	September 26, 1911
369	1416	Reserving Additional Land for Use of Pima and Maricopa Indians	September 28, 1911
370	1417	EO 1337 Revoked, Different Site Reserved for Round Valley Administrative Site for Apache National Forest	October 2, 1911
371	1418	Authorizing Appointment of Edwin M. Hamilton as Lumberman in Indian Service Without Regard to Civil Service Rules	October 2, 1911
372	1419	Amending Section 10 of Act No. 9 of the Sanitary Rules and Regulations for the Canal Zone	October 14, 1911
373	1420	To Prohibit the Practise of Medicine, Surgery, Dentistry, Pharmacy, or Midwifery Without a License	October 14, 1911
374	1421	Amending Civil Service Rules Regarding Exceptions from Examination	October 14, 1911
375	1422	Abolishing Fort Brown Military Reservation, Texas	October 14, 1911
376	1423	Enlarging Military Reservation at Nulato, Alaska	October 24, 1911
377	1424	Burk Administrative Site, Montana, Created for Bitterroot National Forest	October 24, 1911
378	1425	Weeping Child Administrative Site, Montana, Created for Bitterroot National Forest	October 24, 1911
379	1426	Reserving Additional Land in Arizona for Use of Pima and Maricopa Indians	October 23, 1911
380	1427	Authorizing Reinstatement of Edwin H. Peery as Clerk in Office of the Judge Advocate General Without Regard to Civil Service Rules	October 28, 1911
381	1428	Ear Mountain Administrative Site, Montana, Created for Lewis and Clark National Forest	November 1, 1911
382	1429	Reducing Santa Rosa National Forest, Nevada; Lands Returned to Public Domain	November 3, 1911
383	1430	Authorizing Employment of Alumni of National School of Engineering of Mexico Without Regard to Civil Service Rules	November 6, 1911
384	1431	Apache Administrative Site, Arizona, Created for Chiracahua National Forest	November 13, 1911
385	1432	Valley Administrative Site, South Dakota, Created for Sioux National Forest	November 13, 1911
386	1433	To Prevent the Unauthorized Purchase of Supplies and Equipment from Persons in the Army or Navy in the Canal Zone	November 15, 1911
387	1434	Authorizing Reinstatement of Richard W. Barkley as Examiner in Patent Office Without Regard to Civil Service Rules	November 17, 1911
388	1435	To Amend Sections 1 and 2, of Act No. 2, of the Canal Zone Laws, Relating To Notaries Public	November 18, 1911
389	1436	Abolishing Fort Assinniboine Military Reservation, Montana	November 20, 1911
390	1437	Lands Near Albay Province, Luzon, Philippine Islands, Reserved as Target Range for Regan Barracks Military Reservation	November 23, 1911
391	1438	Restoring Certain Lands Between Hot Springs and Fort Gibbon, Alaska, to Public Domain	November 23, 1911
392	1439	Enlarging Cold Springs Bird Refuge, Oregon	November 25, 1911
393	1440	Prescribing Salaries for American Section of International Joint Commission on United States-Canada Boundary Waters	December 4, 1911
394	1441	Bell Mountain Administrative Site, Idaho, Created for Lemhi National Forest	December 4, 1911
395	1442	Authorizing Classification of Charles W. Carson Without Regard to Civil Service Rules	December 5, 1911
396	1443	Amending Civil Service Rule VII, Section 1(c), Regarding Probationary Period	December 9, 1911
397	1444	Amending Civil Service Rules Regarding Removals	December 9, 1911
398	1445	Authorizing Appointment of Thomas Dawson as Watchman in Lighthouse Service Without Regard to Civil Service Rules	December 14, 1911
399	1446	Portion of Salt Lake City Land District, Utah, Transferred to Vernal Land District	December 16, 1911
400	1447	Withdrawing Lands Near Gila River Indian Reservation, Arizona, From Settlement	December 16, 1911
401	1448	To Amend Executive Order Prohibiting the Practice of Medicine, Surgery, Dentistry, Pharmacy, or Midwifery Within the Canal Zone Without a License	December 26, 1911
402	1449	Prescribing Compensation for Members of Commission Investigating Issuance of Stocks and Bonds by Railroad Corporations	December 29, 1911
403	1450	Lands in New Mexico Reserved as Target Range for Fort Bliss Military Reservation, Texas	December 29, 1911
404	1451	Amending Civil Service Rules Regarding Rural Carriers in Post Office Department	December 30, 1911

=== 1912 ===
Relative No.	Absolute No.	Title/Description	Date signed
405	1452	Drew Administrative Site, South Dakota, Created for Use as a Ranger Station in the Administration of the Harney National Forest	January 2, 1912
406	1453	Diamond Administrative Site, Montana, Created for Helena National Forest	January 4, 1912
407	1454	Geyser Springs Administrative Site, Wyoming, Created for Bonneville National Forest	January 6, 1912
408	1455	Riverview Administrative Site, Idaho, created for Nezperce (sic) National Forest	January 6, 1912
409	1456	Lands in Alaska Reserved for Use by Navt Dept. as Wireless Telegraph Station	January 6, 1912
410	1457	Authorizing Reinstatement of Paul Brosig as Draftsman in Isthmian Canal Commission Without Regard to Civil Service Rules	January 9, 1912
411	1458	Establishing Forrester Island Reservation in Alaska as Preserve and Breeding Ground for Native Birds	January 11, 1912
412	1459	Establishing Hazy Islands Reservation in Alaska as Preserve and Breeding Ground for Native Birds	January 11, 1912
413	1460	Authorizing Reinstatement and Transfer of Charles S. Heinline to Clerk in Indian Field Service Without Regard to Civil Service Rules	January 11, 1912
414	1461	Establishing Niobrara Reservation in Nebraska as Preserve and Breeding Ground for Native Birds	January 11, 1912
415	1462	Authorizing Appointment of Florence E. Mole as Clerk Without Regard to Civil Service Rules	January 12, 1912
416	1463	Providing that a Census of the Canal Zone Be Taken Not Later than April 30, 1912	January 12, 1912
417	1464	Reducing Clear Lake Reservation in California	January 13, 1912
418	1465	Reserving Land in Utah for School, Agency, and Other Uses for Benefit of Indians	January 17, 1912
419	1466	Authorizing Reinstatement of Pembrook B. Banton as Clerk in Isthmian Canal Commission Without Regard to Civil Service Rules	January 24, 1912
420	1467	Amending Civil Service Rules Regarding Transfers of Letter Carriers	February 1, 1912
421	1468	To Provide an Inexpensive Method for the Administration of Estates of Deceased and Insane Persons in Certain Cases	February 5, 1912
422	1469	Authorizing Reinstatement of John La Fon, Jr., as Lumberman in Forest Service Without Regard to Civil Service Rules	February 7, 1912
423	1470	Amending Civil Service Rule VII Regarding Probationary Period	February 8, 1912
424	1471	Amending Civil Service Rules Regarding Removals	February 8, 1912
425	1472	Authorizing Government Employees Residing Near District of Columbia to Hold Municipal Office	February 14, 1912
426	1473	Authorizing Appointment of John Lewis Donovan to Classified Service Without Regard to Civil Service Rules	February 16, 1912
427	1474	Malachite Administrative Site, Colorado, Created for San Isabel National Forest	February 16, 1912
428	1475	Restoring Lands to White Mountain and San Carlos Reservation	February 17, 1912
429	1476	Restoring Lands to Jicarilla Apache Indian Reservation	February 17, 1912
430	1477	Restoring Lands to White Mountain Indian Reservation	February 17, 1912
431	1478	Restoring Lands to Tule River Indian Reservation	February 17, 1912
432	1479	Restoring Lands to White Mountain Indian Reservation	February 17, 1912
433	1480	Restoring Lands to Hoopa Valley Indian Reservation	February 17, 1912
434	1481	Restoring Lands to Mescalero Apache Indian Reservation	February 17, 1912
435	1482	Restoring Lands to Zuni and Navajo Indian Reservations	February 17, 1912
436	1483	Restoring Lands in New Mexico to Navajo Reservation	February 17, 1912
437	1484	Authorizing Appointment of Embree E. Hoss, Jr., as Inspector in Post Office Without Examination	February 19, 1912
438	1485	Restoring to Public Domain Lands in California Which Were Reserved for Indian Purposes	February 20, 1912
439	1486	Enlarging Minidoka Reservation, Idaho	February 21, 1912
440	1487	Establishing Green Bay Reservation in Wisconsin as Preserve and Breeding Ground for Native Birds	February 21, 1912
441	1488	Authorizing Reinstatement of Edward W. Cady as Examiner in Patent Office Without Regard to Civil Service Rules	February 23, 1912
442	1489	To Provide a Maximum Speed for Motor Vehicles in the Canal Zone and Establish a Rule of the Road	February 28, 1912
443	1490	Authorizing Appointment of William Langley as Clerk in Census Bureau Without Regard to Civil Service Rules	February 29, 1912
444	1491	Portion of Pine Ridge Indian Reservation, South Dakota, Transferred from Black Hills Land District to Chamberlain Land District	March 1, 1912
445	1492	Compensation for Members of Commission to Investigate Second-Class Mail Costs Prescribed	March 1, 1912
446	1493	Compensation for Daniel L. Cease, Member of Commission to Investigate Employers' Liability, Prescribed	March 1, 1912
447	1494	Compensation for Members of Commission to Investigate Second-Class Mail Costs Amended	March 11, 1912
448	1495	Reserving Hunter's Rock or Prince Island in Pacific Ocean for Use of Smith River Indians	March 11, 1912
449	1496	Reserving Land in California for Indian Use	March 11, 1912
450	1497	Government Employees in District of Columbia Granted Half Holiday, March 23, to Attend USS Maine Memorial Services	March 15, 1912
451	1498	Sanitary Inspection Of Government Buildings	March 15, 1912
452	1499	Disposal of Useless Papers	March 16, 1912
453	1500	Rock Creek Administrative Site, Montana, Created for Cabinet National Forest	March 20, 1912
454	1501	Authorizing Reinstatement of Charles W. Rider in Post Office Department Without Regard to Civil Service Rules	March 23, 1912
455	1502	Alder Administrative Site, Montana, Created for Jefferson National Forest	March 23, 1912
456	1503	Carney Administrative Site, Montana, Created for Madison National Forests	March 23, 1912
457	1504	Weeping Child Administrative Site, Montana, Re-Established for Bitterroot National Forest	March 25, 1912
458	1505	Portion of Fort Berthold Indian Reservation, North Dakota, Transferred to Minot Land District	March 26, 1912
459	1506	Authorizing Reinstatement of Charles W. Rider as Storekeeper-Gauger in Internal Revenue Service Without Regard to Civil Service Rules	March 26, 1912
460	1507	Portion of Barracks Lot Military Reservation, Oahu, Hawaii, Restored to Government of Territory of Hawaii for Use by militia	March 27, 1912
461	1508	Authorizing Appointment of Y. Tsenshan Wang as Field Assistant in Geological Survey Without Regard to Civil Service Rules	March 30, 1912
462	1509	Authorizing Appointment of Andrew M. Latham as Clerk in Department of Agriculture Without Regard to Civil Service Rules	March 30, 1912
463	1510	Reducing Lincoln National Forest and Reserving Lands for Military Purposes	April 1, 1912
464	1511	Katka Administrative Site, Idaho, Created for Pend Oreille National Forest	April 1, 1912
465	1512	Lands on Near Island, Near Kodiak Island, Alaska, Reserved for Use by Agriculture Dept. as Experiment Station	April 1, 1912
466	1513	Lands on Kodiak Island, Alaska, on Kalsin Bay, Reserved for Use by Agriculture Dept. as Experiment Station	April 1, 1912
467	1514	Communications to Congress by Employees of the United States	April 8, 1912
468	1515	Authorizing Appointment of Margaret C. Leonard as Clerk in War Department Without Regard to Civil Service Rules	April 9, 1912
469	1516	Amending Civil Service Rules Regarding Exceptions from Examination for Inspectors in Interior Department	April 10, 1912
470	1517	Reserving Land in California for Indian Use	April 13, 1912
471	1518	Withdrawing Lands from Flathead or Jocko Reservation for Examination and Classification	April 13, 1912
472	1519	To Prevent Trespassing Upon Reservations [in the Canal Zone]	April 17, 1912
473	1520	Land Near Ketchikan, Tongass Narrows, Revillagigedo Island, Alaska, Reserved for Lighthouse Purposes	April 20, 1912
474	1521	Authorizing Reinstatement of Charles H. Quackenbush in Railway Mail Service Without Regard to Civil Service Rules	April 22, 1912
475	1522	Reserving Land in California for Indian Use	April 24, 1912
476	1523	Harney National Forest, South Dakota, Diminished	April 29, 1912
477	1524	Authorizing Appointment of Homer C. Poundstone in Civil Service Commission Without Examination	April 30, 1912
478	1525	Requiring Purchases to Conform to the United States Government Specification for Portland Cement	April 30, 1912
479	1526	Lands in New Mexico Reserved for Use by Agriculture Dept as Experiment Station for Native Pastures and Breeding of Horses	May 3, 1912
480	1527	Amending Civil Service Rules Regarding Probationary Periods	May 3, 1912
481	1528	Grey Bull Administrative Site, Wyoming, Created for Shoshone National Forest	May 9, 1912
482	1529	Reserving Lands in California Pending Investigation as to Suitableness for Paiute or Other Indian Use	May 9, 1912
483	1530	Authorizing Appointment of Louise Lester as Clerk in Classified Service Without Regard to Civil Service Rules	May 10, 1912
484	1531	Portion of Punchbowl Hill Military Reservation, Oahu, Restored to Government of Territory of Hawaii for Park Purposes	May 11, 1912
485	1532	To Amend the Executive Order Providing for the Collection of a Distillation Tax	May 21, 1912
486	1533	Authorizing Reinstatement of Walter L. Barnum as Clerk in Classified Service Without Regard to Civil Service Rules	May 27, 1912
487	1534	Authorizing Reinstatement of Wesley M. Featherly in Classified Service Without Regard to Civil Service Rules	May 28, 1912
488	1535	Coldspring Administrative Site, Idaho, Created for Targhee National Forest	May 28, 1912
489	1536	Taylor Creek Administrative Site, Oregon, Created for Siskiyou National Forest	May 28, 1912
490	1537	Roosevelt Annex Administrative Site, Arizona, Created for Coronado National Forest	May 28, 1912
491	1538	Lands in Pinal County, Arizona, Reserved for Use of the Papago and Other Indians	May 28, 1912
492	1539	Deep Creek Band - Reserving Lands in Tooele County, Utah, for Use by Indians on Public Domain	May 29, 1912
493	1540	Reserving Land in Arizona for Use by Walapai Indians	May 29, 1912
494	1541	Civil and Spanish-American War Veterans Given Preference in Decoration Day Holiday Granted Government Employees	May 29, 1912
495	1542	Authorizing Reinstatement of Arthur S. Blum as Photographer in Forest Service Without Regard to Civil Service Rules	June 5, 1912
496	1543	Authorizing Appointment of Margaret A. Hampton as Clerk in Classified Service Without Regard to Civil Service Rules	June 6, 1912
497	1544	Authorizing Appointment of May Stanley in Classified Service Without Examination	June 11, 1912
498	1545	Brownsville, Texas, Plant Introduction-Garden	June 12, 1912
499	1546	Authorizing Reinstatement of Oscar Wenderoth as Supervising Architect in Treasury Department Without Regard to Civil Service Rules	June 15, 1912
500	1547	Waiving Provisions of Eight-Hour Contract Act for Canal Zone Contracts Until January 1, 1915	June 19, 1912
501	1548	Authorizing Appointment of John G. Lerch as Private Secretary Without Examination	June 19, 1912
502	1549	Authorizing Transfer of M. M. Dodge to Naturalization Examiner Without Regard to Civil Service Rules	June 19, 1912
503	1550	Sevier National Forest, Utah, Diminished	June 19, 1912
504	1551	Divide Administrative Site, Montana, Created for Deerlodge National Forest	June 19, 1912
505	1552	Whitetail Administrative Site, Montana, Created for Deerlodge National Forest	June 19, 1912
506	1553	Rebel Creek Administrative Site, Nevada, Created for Santa Rosa National Forest	June 19, 1912
507	1554	Charles W Cobb, Assistant Atty General, Designated to Act as Interior Secretary During Absence of Said Sec'y	June 19, 1912
508	1555	Reserving Lands Near Hydaburg, Alaska, for Use of the Hydah Tribe of Indians	June 19, 1912
509	1556	Authorizing Proportions of All National Flags and Union Jacks for Departments of Government	June 24, 1912
510	1557	Reserving Land on Left Bank of Tanana River, Alaska, for Military Purposes	July 3, 1912
511	1558	Reserving Land in South Dakota for Indian School and Administrative Purposes	July 6, 1912
512	1559	Fort Armstrong Military Reservation, Kaakaukukui Reef, Honolulu, Hawaii, Enlarged	July 6, 1912
513	1560	Rico Sarco Administrative Site, New Mexico, Created for Pecos National Forest	July 10, 1912
514	1561	Authorizing Reinstatement of Leroy A. McGee as Post Office Inspector Without Regard to Civil Service Rules	July 10, 1912
515	1562	Authorizing Retention of Fourteen Tariff Board Employees Without Regard to Civil Service Rules	July 12, 1912
516	1563	Redding Land Office, California, Abolished and Transferred to Sacramento Land Office	July 18, 1912
517	1564	Nine Mile Administrative Site, Montana, Created for Lolo National Forest	July 19, 1912
518	1565	Butterfly Administrative Site, Montana, Created for Bitterroot National Forest	July 19, 1912
519	1566	Authorizing Appointment of Dorsey E. Phillips as Clerk in Classified Service Without Regard to Civil Service Rules	July 19, 1912
520	1567	Ordering Executive Department Heads to Send Information on Office Archives to Librarian of Congress	July 19, 1912
521	1568	Baker Administrative Site, Utah, Enlarged for La Sal National Forest	July 23, 1912
522	1569	Authorizing Reinstatement of Isaac D. Laferty in Bureau of Pensions Without Regard to Civil Service Rules	July 23, 1912
523	1570	Authorizing Reinstatement of James D. Goldsby in Classified Service Without Regard to Civil Service Rules	July 25, 1912
524	1571	Authorizing Promotion of Richard T. Underwood to Clerk in Post Office Department Without Examination	July 27, 1912
525	1572	Three Forks Administrative Site, Colorado, Created for Rio Grande National Forest	July 30, 1912
526	1573	Authorizing Appointment of Mingo Sanders as Messenger in Classified Service Without Regard to Civil Service Rules	July 31, 1912
527	1574	Excusing Federal Employees From Work on Labor Day	August 1, 1912
528	1575	Authorizing Reinstatement of George H. Getz as to Pension Office Without Regard to Civil Service Rules	August 10, 1912
529	1576	Lands in Oregon Reserved for Classification and Pending Legislation	August 13, 1912
530	1577	Aliso Administrative Site, California, Created for Cleveland National Forest	August 13, 1912
531	1578	Lands in Oregon Reserved Pending Legislation for Inclusion in National Forest	August 13, 1912
532	1579	Transferring Certain Lands from Fort Duschesne Military Reservation to Interior Department	August 19, 1912
533	1580	Permitting Temporary Employment of Machinists, Tool Makers, Electricians, and Apprentice Boys by the Census Bureau Without Regard to Civil Service Rules	August 21, 1912
534	1581	Authorizing Appointment of Sadie A. Wright as Charwoman Without Regard to Civil Service Commission Regulations	August 23, 1912
535	1582	Amending Civil Service Rules Regarding State Department Positions	August 24, 1912
536	1583	Allowing Federal Employees to Serve as Moderators of Town Meetings	August 24, 1912
537	1584	Unnumbered EO of December 5, 1911, Creating Alaskan Withdrawal No. 1, Modified	August 24, 1912
538	1585	View Administrative Site, Arizona, Created for Crook National Forest	August 24, 1912
539	1586	Directing Commissioner of Pensions to Employ 30 Former Post Office Clerks	August 24, 1912
540	1587	Authorizing Appointment of D. K. Tuttle, Joseph W. Milson, and E. B. Leach as Mint Superintendents Without Regard to Civil Service Rules	August 24, 1912
541	1588	Position of Special Employee in Internal Revenue Service Regarded as Classified Under Civil Service Rules	August 24, 1912
542	1589	Rainy Creek Administrative Site, Idaho, Created for Palisade National Forest	August 24, 1912
543	1590	Maj. Gen. Leonard Wood, Chief of Staff, Designated to Act as Secretary of War During Absence of Sec'y and Assistant Sec'y of War	August 24, 1912
544	1591	Authorizing Retention of William W. Dyar in Forest Service With Alternate Appropriation	August 26, 1912
545	1592	Amending Civil Service Rules Regarding Exceptions from Examination	August 26, 1912
546	1593	Authorizing Classification of Up to 115 Experts and Agents in Agriculture Department	August 26, 1912
547	1594	Authorizing Reinstatement of Lillian E. Clark as Clerk in Office of Indian Affairs Without Regard to Civil Service Rules	August 31, 1912
548	1595	Enlargement of Camp Overton Military Reservation, Province of Morano, Mindanao, P.I.	August 31, 1912
549	1596	Authorizing Reinstatement of G. M. Davison as Storekeeper-Gauger in Internal Revenue Service Without Regard to Civil Service Rules	September 2, 1912
550	1597	Fitzhugh Springs Addition Administrative Site, California, Created for Modoc National Forest	September 2, 1912
551	1598	Eliminating Certain Lands from Reservation of Papago Indians	September 2, 1912
552	1599	Lands in Colorado Reserved Pending Legislation (to Grant to Denver for Park Purposes)	September 7, 1912
553	1600	Trail Administrative Site, Idaho, Created for Caribou National Forest	September 7, 1912
554	1601	Authorizing Appointment of James B. Brunemer as Watchman in Government Printing Office Without Regard to Civil Service Rules	September 7, 1912
555	1602	Authorizing Appointment of Mabel Hiatt as Clerk in Department of Agriculture Without Regard to Civil Service Rules	September 7, 1912
556	1603	Reserving Lands in California Pending Investigation as to Suitableness for Paiute or Other Indian Use	September 7, 1912
557	1604	Authorizing Promotion of George E. Long to Clerk in Bureau of Insular Affairs Without Examination	September 12, 1912
558	1605	Consolidating the Administrative District of Gorgona With that of Empire, and for Other Purposes	September 12, 1912
559	1606	Reserving Land in Nevada for Indian Allotment Purposes	September 16, 1912
560	1607	Internal Revenue District of South Carolina Consolidated with 4th District of North Carolina	September 16, 1912
561	1608	Fourth Internal Revenue District of California Consolidated with 1st District	September 17, 1912
562	1609	Authorizing Reinstatement of George S. Livingston in Pension Office Without Regard to Civil Service Rules	September 17, 1912
563	1610	Camp John Hay Military Reservation, Baguio, Luzon, Philippine Islands, Modified	September 17, 1912
564	1611	Liberty Administrative Site, Washington, Created for Wenatchee National Forest	September 19, 1912
565	1612	Authorizing Appointment of R. A. Kirk as Deputy Collector of Internal Revenue Without Regard to Civil Service Rules	September 21, 1912
566	1613	Harbors Not Subject to Entry	September 23, 1912
567	1614	Additional Pay for Gun Captains in Marine Corps Prescribed	September 23, 1912
568	1615	Fourth Internal Revenue District of Texas Consolidated with 3rd District	September 23, 1912
569	1616	Authorizing Promotion of George E. Long to Clerk in Bureau of Insular Affairs Without Examination	September 30, 1912
570	1617	Camp Jossman and Camp Wilhelm Military Reservations, Philippine Islands, Abolished	September 30, 1912
571	1618	12th Internal Revenue District of Pennsylvania Consolidated with 9th District	September 30, 1912
572	1619	Sublunary Administrative Site, Idaho, Created for Pend Oreille National Forest	October 2, 1912
573	1620	Authorizing Reinstatement of John K. Robinson as Printer in Weather Bureau Without Regard to Civil Service Rules	October 4, 1912
574	1621	Altering Lands Composing Reservation of Papago Indians	October 8, 1912
575	1622	Oregon National Forest Diminished	October 11, 1912
576	1623	Dome Mountain Administrative Site, Montana, Created for Absaroka National Forest	October 11, 1912
577	1624	Amending Civil Service Rules to Limit Exceptions from Examination for Certain Postmasters	October 15, 1912
578	1625	Authorizing Reinstatement of Charles A. Bronson as Assistant Postmaster Without Regard to Civil Service Rules	October 17, 1912
579	1626	Station B Administrative Site of Palisade National Forest, Idaho, Modified	October 17, 1912
580	1627	Authorizing Appointment of Ulysses S. Price as Deputy Shipping Commissioner Without Regard to Civil Service Rules	October 18, 1912
581	1628	Fort Pikit and Fort Reina Regente Military Reservations, Cotabato, Moro Province, Philippine Islands, Created	October 19, 1912
582	1629	Siassi Military Reservation, Moro Province, Philippine Islands, Enlarged	October 19, 1912
583	1630	Authorizing Appointment of Louis R. Krumm as Chief Inspector in Bureau of Navigation, Department of Commerce and Labor, Without Regard to Civil Service Rules	October 28, 1912
584	1631	Authorizing Appointment of De Lorma A. Morrow as Special Agent in Bureau of Corporations Without Regard to Civil Service Rules	October 28, 1912
585	1632	Adding Lands in Nevada to the Moapa River Indian Reservation	October 28, 1912
586	1633	Lands in Arizona Reserved as Rifle Range for National Guard	October 28, 1912
587	1634	Sawyer Administrative Site, Utah, Created for Dixie National Forest	October 28, 1912
588	1635	Authorizing Appointment of Guy Emerson as Special Agent in Treasury Department Without Regard to Civil Service Rules	October 28, 1912
589	1636	Authorizing Appointment of E. O. Merchant as Special Agent in Bureau of Corporations Without Regard to Civil Service Rules	October 29, 1912
590	1637	Revoking Executive Order No. 1556 of June 24, 1912 so as to Prescribe More Exact Proportions for All Flags and Union Jacks for Departments of Government	October 29, 1912
591	1638	Authorizing Appointment of Mrs. Robert L. Bowman as Matron in Indian Service Without Examination	November 1, 1912
592	1639	Penal Sum of Bond of Receiver of Public Moneys at Great Falls, Montana, Fixed at $30,000	November 8, 1912
593	1640	Deep Creek Administrative Site, Montana, Created for Helena National Forest	November 8, 1912
594	1641	Deer Lick Administrative Site, Idaho, Created for Payette National Forest	November 8, 1912
595	1642	Niobrara Reservation, Nebraska, Re-Established as Preserve and Breeding Ground for Birds	November 14, 1912
596	1643	American Fork Administrative Site, Montana, Created for Absaroka National Forest	November 14, 1912
597	1644	Exception of Employees at the Neopit Lumber Mills	November 15, 1912
598	1645	County of Miami Transferred from 10th Internal Revenue Collection District of Ohio to 1st District	November 22, 1912
599	1646	Little Walnut Administrative Site, Arizona, Created for Tonto National Forest	November 23, 1912
600	1647	Ashland Administrative Site, Montana, Created for Custer National Forest	November 23, 1912
601	1648	Vernal Land Office, Utah, Abolished; Transferred to Salt Lake City Land Office; Revoked by EO 1706	November 23, 1912
602	1649	Altering Lands Composing the Moapa River Indian Reservation	November 26, 1912
603	1650	Authorizing Appointment of William R. Carpenter as Clerk in Post Office Department Without Regard to Civil Service Rules	November 27, 1912
604	1651	Authorizing Transfer of George W. Baptist to Classified Position in Custom House Without Regard to Civil Service Rules	November 27, 1912
605	1652	Authorizing Appointment of George H. Hamilton as Assistant Postmaster Without Regard to Civil Service Rules	November 29, 1912
606	1653	Authorizing Reinstatement of W. B. Johnson in General Land Office Without Regard to Civil Service Rules	December 3, 1912
607	1654	Authorizing Reinstatement of Louis H. Eberlein in Customs Service Without Regard to Civil Service Rules	December 3, 1912
608	1655	Altering Lands Composing Reservation of Papago Indians	December 5, 1912
609	1656	Directing the Chairman of the Isthmian Canal Commission to Take Possession of All Land and Land Under Water Within the Canal Zone	December 5, 1912
610	1657	Authorizing Appointment of Dorsey E. Phillips as Clerk or Immigrant Inspector Without Regard to Civil Service Rules	December 7, 1912
611	1658	Chemisso Island Reservation, Alaska, Created as Preserve and Breeding Ground for Birds	December 7, 1912
612	1659	Revoking Civil Service Rule 3, Sec. 3, to Include Navy Department Artisan and Supervisory Artisan Positions in Competitive Classified Service	December 7, 1912
613	1660	Alta Administrative Site at Bitterroot National Forest, Montana, Enlarged	December 10, 1912
614	1661	Reserving Certain Lands at Port Angeles, Washington for the Treasury Department, the Forest Service, and the Weather Bureau	December 12, 1912
615	1662	Authorizing Appointment of Alice Engle as Clerk in Department of Agriculture Without Regard to Civil Service Rules	December 14, 1912
616	1663	Authorizing Appointment of Guy Emerson to Classified Position in Treasury Department Without Regard to Civil Service Rules	December 16, 1912
617	1664	Pishkun Reservation, Montana, Created as Preserve and Breeding Ground for Native Birds	December 17, 1912
618	1665	Authorizing Appointment of Charles R. Pickard in Competitive Classified Service Without Regard to Civil Service Rules	December 17, 1912
619	1666	Authorizing Reinstatement of William C. Boutelle in Post Office Department Without Regard to Civil Service Rules	December 19, 1912
620	1667	Authorizing Promotion of Thomas E. Price to Clerk in Post Office Department Without Examination	December 19, 1912
621	1668	Authorizing Transfer of Horace P. De Hart to Position in Interior Department Without Regard to Civil Service Rules	December 19, 1912
622	1669	Establishing Desecheo Island Reservation as a Preserve and Breeding Ground for Native Birds	December 19, 1912
623	1670	Authorizing Reinstatement of Samuel E. Fouts as Assistant Examiner in Patent Office Without Regard to Civil Service Rules	December 30, 1912
624	1671	Authorizing Appointment of W. D. Lundy as Clerk Without Regard to Civil Service Rules	December 31, 1912
625	1672	Petersburg Administrative Site, Alaska, Created for Tongass National Forest	December 31, 1912
626	1673	Comanche Administrative Site, Utah, Created for Use as a Ranger Station in the Administration of the Dixie National Forest	December 31, 1912

=== 1913 ===
Relative No.	Absolute No.	Title/Description	Date signed
627	1674	Authorizing Reinstatement of Ralph D. Converse as Immigrant Inspector in Department of Commerce and Labor Without Regard to Civil Service Rules	January 1, 1913
628	1675	Authorizing Reinstatement of James E. Taylor in Internal Revenue Service Without Regard to Civil Service Rules	January 3, 1913
629	1676	Authorizing Reinstatement of William B. Kilpatrick to Competitive Service Without Regard to Civil Service Rules	January 8, 1913
630	1677	Gallinas Administrative Site, New Mexico, created for Lincoln National Forest	January 8, 1913
631	1678	Gravel Island Reservation, Lake Michigan, Created as Preserve and Breeding Ground for Birds	January 9, 1913
632	1679	Authorizing Transfer of John J. Donahue in Bureau of Pensions Without Regard to Civil Service Rules	January 9, 1913
633	1680	To Amend the Executive Order Providing for the Inspection of Steam Vessels	January 13, 1913
634	1681	Reserving Lands in Nevada for the Paiute and Shoshoni Indians	January 14, 1913
635	1682	Setting Aside Lands in Montana for Administrative Purposes in Connection with Flathead Indians	January 14, 1913
636	1683	Dog Canyon Administrative Site, New Mexico, Created for Lincoln National Forest	January 16, 1913
637	1684	Authorizing Appointment of Mrs. Ollie M. Croghan as Clerk in Department of Justice Without Regard to Civil Service Rules	January 17, 1913
638	1685	Authorizing Appointment of Monico Lopez as Messenger in Office of the Chief of the Quartermaster Corps, United States Army, Without Regard to Civil Service Rules	January 21, 1913
639	1686	Amending Schedule For Army Rations Regarding Lard and Ration for Troops on Transports	January 21, 1913
640	1687	Authorizing Reinstatement of George J. Bunce to Subclerical Position in Mint and Assay Service Without Regard to Civil Service Rules	January 24, 1913
641	1688	Authorizing Reemployment of John Moynihan as Laborer in Post Office at Kansas City, Missouri, Without Regard to Civil Service Rules	January 24, 1913
642	1689	Authorizing Transfer of John Garcin in Forest Service Without Regard to Civil Service Rules	January 24, 1913
643	1690	Authorizing Appointment of Mrs. C. E. Jones as Clerk in Classified Service Without Regard to Civil Service Rules	January 24, 1913
644	1691	Authorizing Promotion of Gertrude Printz to Clerk Treasury Department Without Regard to Civil Service Rules	January 24, 1913
645	1692	Authorizing Placement of Mrs. Mabel P. LeRoy in Classified Service in Interior Department Without Regard to Civil Service Rules	January 27, 1913
646	1693	Authorizing Appointment of Laura A. Thompson as Clerk in Children's Bureau Without Regard to Civil Service Rules	January 27, 1913
647	1694	Sum of Penal Bond of Receiver of Public Moneys at Guthrie, Oklahoma, Fixed at $15,000	January 27, 1913
648	1695	Amending Consular Regulations, Paragraph 35, Regarding Bonding of Interpreters Promoted from Student Corps	January 29, 1913
649	1696	Authorizing Reinstatement of Will S. Cox as Railway Mail Clerk Without Regard to Civil Service Rules	February 3, 1913
650	1697	Amending Civil Service Rules Regarding Exceptions from Examination in Navy Department	February 4, 1913
651	1698	Authorizing Appointment of Cyrus F. Adams to Competitive Position Without Regard to Civil Service Rules	February 7, 1913
652	1699	Reserving Lands in Arizona for Use of Navajo Indians	February 10, 1913
653	1700	Reserving Lands in New Mexico for Use of Navajo Indians	February 10, 1913
654	1701	Kansas National Forest Enlarged	February 10, 1913
655	1702	Certain Government Employees Granted Leave to Attend U.S.S. Maine Memorial Services on Feb. 15, 1913	February 12, 1913
656	1703	Agur Barracks Military Reservation, Jolo, Moro Province, Philippine Islands, Enlarged	February 14, 1913
657	1704	Poviding That Las Sabanas Be Excepted from the Provisions of Executive Order of Dec. 5, 1912	February 18, 1913
658	1705	Providing that United States Citizens Employed for 1 Year on Isthmus of Panama May Be Transferred to Corresponding Positions in Classified Service in Executive Departments	February 18, 1913
659	1706	Revoking EO 1648, Which Had Abolished Vernal Land Office, Utah	February 20, 1913
660	1707	Authorizing Promotion and Appointment of John Fitzgerald as Merchandise Sampler in Treasury Department Without Regard to Civil Service Rules	February 20, 1913
661	1708	Authorizing Promotion and Transfer of Martin J. Murphy to Clerk in Treasury Department Without Regard to Civil Service Rules	February 20, 1913
662	1709	Amending Civil Service Rules Regarding Exceptions from Examination in Treasury Department	February 20, 1913
663	1710	Authorizing Reinstatement of David C. Hanawalt in Bureau of Animal Industry Without Regard to Civil Service Rules	February 20, 1913
664	1711	Authorizing Reinstatement of John S. Beach in Pension Office Without Regard to Civil Service Rules	February 21, 1913
665	1712	Passports Issued to Laborers from Foreign Countries	February 24, 1913
666	1713	Five Islands in West Sound, Washington (Including Sheep, Double, Victim, and Freeman) Reserved for Public Purposes	February 24, 1913
667	1714	Amending Civil Service Rules Regarding Former Private Secretaries in Post Office Department	February 25, 1913
668	1715	Authorizing Appointment of John J. Farrell as Letter Carrier in Brooklyn, New York, Post Office Without Regard to Civil Service Rules	February 25, 1913
669	1716	Approved Findings and Conclusions of Commissioners Francis M. Corkrell and Sam R. Scott Regarding Boundary Line Between New Mexico and Texas	February 25, 1913
670	1717	Chamberlain Land District, South Dakota, Abolished; Transferred to Gregory Land District	February 26, 1913
671	1718	Office for Gregory Land District, South Dakota, Moved from Gregory to Carter	February 26, 1913
672	1719	Certain Lands Transferred from Chamberlain Land District, South Dakota, to Pierre Land District	February 26, 1913
673	1720	Authorizing Reinstatement of Ralph Hoagland as Laboratory Inspector in Bureau of Animal Industry Without Regard to Civil Service Rules	February 26, 1913
674	1721	Authorizing Appointment of Matthew A. Henson to Any Suitable Position in Classified Service Without Regard to Civil Service Rules	February 26, 1913
675	1722	Authorizing Appointment of Charles A. Gibson in Bureau of Plant Industry Without Regard to Civil Service Rules	February 26, 1913
676	1722½	Providing a Method of Compensation for Personal Injuries to, or for the Death of, Employees of the Isthmian Canal Commission and of the Panama Railroad Company	February 26, 1913
677	1723	Authorizing Reinstatement of Frank P. Caviezel in Internal Revenue Service Without Regard to Civil Service Rules	February 27, 1913
678	1724	Authorizing Appointment of Seward Charles in Office of the Supervising Architect in the Treasury Department Without Regard to Civil Service Rules	February 27, 1913
679	1725	Authorizing Transfer of Alexander J. Stormont to Clerk in Classified Service Without Examination	February 28, 1913
680	1726	Authorizing Transfer of Aaron Burnett in Treasury Department Without Regard to Civil Service Rules	February 28, 1913
681	1727	Authorizing Transfer of William F. Smith to Classified Position Without Regard to Civil Service Rules	February 28, 1913
682	1728	Federal Per Diem Employees and Day Laborers Excused from Work on Inauguration Day, March 4, 1913	February 28, 1913
683	1729	Authorizing Appointment of Louise F. Bradley as Charwoman in State, War, and Navy Department Building Without Regard to Labor Regulations	March 3, 1913
684	1730	Authorizing Appointment of Col. Heber M. Creel as Supervisor of Indian Schools Without Regard to Civil Service Rules	March 3, 1913
685	1731	Authorizing Appointment of Katharine T. Gerald in Bureau of Pensions Without Examination	March 3, 1913
686	1732	Authorizing Appointment of Alice E. Gibbs to Classified Position Without Regard to Civil Service Rules	March 3, 1913
687	1733	Establishing Aleutian Islands Reservation as Preserve for Native Birds, Animals, and Fish	March 3, 1913
688	1734	Authorizing Appointment of Jesse L. Suter as Clerk in Classified Service Without Regard to Civil Service Rules	March 3, 1913
689	1735	Authorizing Appointment of Thomas Butler as Laborer in Classified Service Without Examination	March 3, 1913
690	1736	Authorizing Reinstatement of Joab P. Foster as Veterinary Inspector in Department of Agriculture Without Regard to Civil Service Rules	March 3, 1913
691	1737	Authorizing Reinstatement of Fred Roege as Assistant Postmaster Without Regard to Civil Service Rules	March 3, 1913
692	1738	Authorizing Appointment of Charles H. Shaw in New York Customs Service Without Regard to Civil Service Rules	March 3, 1913
693	1739	Authorizing Reinstatement of H. Norman Fleming as Clerk in Pension Office Without Regard to Civil Service Rules	March 3, 1913
694	1740	Authorizing Appointment of Catherine Branan as Charwoman in Treasury Department Without Regard to Civil Service Rules\	March 3, 1913
695	1741	Authorizing Appointment of Edward Hawkins as Laborer in Department of Agriculture Without Regard to Civil Service Rules	March 3, 1913
696	1742	Cottonwood Administrative Site, Utah, Created for La Sal National Forest	March 3, 1913
697	1743	Nebo National Forest, Utah, Diminished and the Excluded Lands Withdrawn for Classification and Eventual Restoration to Settlement and Entry	March 3, 1913

== Presidential proclamations ==
=== 1909 ===
Relative No.	Absolute No.	Title/Description	Date signed
1	872	Extra Session of Congress (Mar. 6)	March 6, 1909
2	873	Establishment of the Navajo National Monument, Arizona	March 20, 1909
3	882	Setting Aside the Gran Quivira National Monument, New Mexico	

=== 1910 ===
Relative No.	Absolute No.	Title/Description	Date signed
4	1021	Extending United States Copyright Protections to the Works of Certain Foreign Authors	April 9, 1910

=== 1912 ===
Relative No.	Absolute No.	Title/Description	Date signed
5	1175	Admitting New Mexico to the Union	January 6, 1912
6	1180	Admitting Arizona to the Union	February 14, 1912
7	1186	Navajo National Monument, Arizona (Boundary Adjustment)	March 14, 1912
8	1225	Panama Canal Toll Rates	November 13, 1912

=== 1913 ===
Relative No.	Absolute No.	Title/Description	Date signed
9	1236	Modifying Leadville National Forest, Colorado (Mar. 3)	March 3, 1913
