= Senator Jefferson =

Senator Jefferson may refer to:

- Anna V. Jefferson (1926–2011), New York State Senate
- Benjamin Lafayette Jefferson (1871–1950), Colorado State Senate
- William J. Jefferson (born 1947), Louisiana State Senate
