= Trivelli =

Trivelli is a surname. Notable people with the surname include:

- Paul A. Trivelli (born 1953), American diplomat
- Renzo Trivelli (1925–2015), Italian politician
