= Mauricio Solaún =

American diplomat (born 1935)

Mauricio Solaún (born 1935) is a professor of Latin American social and political institutions at the University of Illinois. He holds degrees in law, economics, and sociology from the Universidad de Villanueva, Cuba, Yale University, and the University of Chicago, respectively.

Solaún has been a visiting professor at the Universidad de los Andes and the Universidad Pontificia Javeriana in Bogotá, the Universidad de Belgrano in Buenos Aires, and the Universidad Católica de Valparaíso in Chile. He has been awarded several international fellowships and research grants, and has been a guest lecturer throughout Latin America and several countries in Europe and Asia. He has organized and directed study/internship programs in Colombia, Chile, Argentina, and Mexico.

Solaún was the first Cuban-American to serve as a U.S. Ambassador. From September 1977 to February 1979 he served in Nicaragua, where he organized locally a United States-sponsored mediation by the Organization of American States to avert civil war and obtain the peaceful democratization of the country. These international efforts failed in the face of the local unwillingness to compromise, and Solaún returned to his university post.

== Works ==
- Solaún, Mauricio; Michael A. Quinn (1973). Sinners and Heretics: The Politics of Military Intervention in Latin America. Urbana: University of Illinois Press. ISBN 0-252-00284-9. OCLC 636351.
- Solaún, Mauricio; Sidney Kronus (1973). Discrimination without Violence: Miscegenation and Racial Conflict in Latin America. New York: Wiley. ISBN 0-471-81100-9. OCLC 632484.
- Berry, R. Albert; Ronald G. Hellman; Mauricio Solaún (1980). Politics of Compromise: Coalition Government in Colombia. New Brunswick, N.J.: Transaction Books. ISBN 0-87855-301-0. OCLC 4490736.
- Solaún, Mauricio (2002). U.S. Interventions in Latin America: "Plan Colombia". Urbana: Program in Arms Control, Disarmament, and International Security (ACDIS), University of Illinois (ACDIS Occasional Paper). Archived from the original on 2010-07-05.
- Solaún, Mauricio (2005). U.S. Intervention and Regime Change in Nicaragua. Lincoln, NE: University of Nebraska Press. ISBN 0-8032-4316-2. OCLC 469497199.

Diplomatic posts
Preceded by James D. Theberge	United States Ambassador to Nicaragua; September 30, 1977 – February 26, 1979	Succeeded by Lawrence A. Pezzullo
