= James D. Theberge =

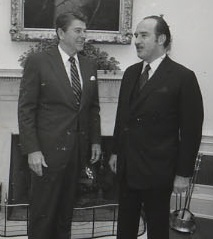
James D. Theberge in the Oval Office with Ronald Reagan, 1982

James Daniel Theberge (December 28, 1930 – January 20, 1988) was a United States ambassador to Nicaragua (1975–1977) and Chile (1982–1985).

== Early life and education ==
He was born in Oceanside, New York, and received a B.A. from Columbia University in 1952, an M.A. from Oxford University in 1960, and did graduate work at Heidelberg University. He later received an M.P.A. (public administration) from Harvard University in 1965. He was a Littauer Fellow at Harvard.

== Career ==
Theberge served as an economic adviser for the United States Embassy in Argentina from 1961 to 1964. From 1966 to 1969 he served as senior economist for the Inter-American Development Bank in Washington. From 1970 to 1975 he was director of the Latin American and Hispanic Studies Center at Georgetown University. He also taught at St Antony's College, Oxford and St Peter's College, Oxford as well as universities in Argentina, Brazil, and California.

In 1974 and 1975 he was the Latin America project director of the Commission on Critical Choices for Americans. In 1975, he was appointed Ambassador to Nicaragua by President Gerald Ford, serving two years. He then served as president of the Institute for Conflict and Policy Studies, a think tank based in Washington, D.C. from 1977 to 1979 and an adviser to Planning Research Corporation from 1979 to 1981 and adviser to the United States Department of Defense from 1981 to 1982. President Ronald Reagan appointed him Ambassador to Chile in 1982. He remained in this post for three years.

In 1986, he was appointed to the United States International Narcotics Control Commission by Ronald Reagan. He was the Chairman of the National Council on Latin America and a senior counselor of the Atlantic Council. From 1986 through his death in 1988 he was also a member of the Senior Review Panel of the CIA.

He was the author of multiple books, including "Reflections of a Diplomat," published in 1985, "Soviet Presence in Latin America," "Latin America: Struggle for Progress," and "Spain in the '70s.

== Personal life ==
Theberge died in 1988 after a heart attack on a visit to Jamaica. He was survived by his wife, Giselle Fages Theberge, and three sons, James Christopher, John Paul, and Alexander Leonard, all of Washington.

Diplomatic posts
Preceded by Turner B. Shelton	United States Ambassador to Nicaragua; 1975–1977	Succeeded by Mauricio Solaún
Preceded by George W. Landau	United States Ambassador to Chile; 1982–1985	Succeeded by Harry George Barnes, Jr.
