= Lawrence Pezzullo =

American diplomat and Foreign Service officer

United States Ambassador to Uruguay
- In office August 10, 1977 – May 29, 1979
- President: Jimmy Carter
- Preceded by: Ernest V. Siracusa
- Succeeded by: Lyle Franklin Lane

United States Ambassador to Nicaragua
- In office July 31, 1979 – August 18, 1981
- President: Jimmy Carter; Ronald Reagan
- Preceded by: Mauricio Solaún
- Succeeded by: Anthony Cecil Eden Quainton

Personal details
- Born: Lawrence Anthony Pezzullo; May 3, 1926 New York City, New York, U.S.
- Died: July 26, 2017 (aged 91) Baltimore, Maryland, U.S.
- Spouse: Josephine DiMattia
- Education: Columbia University (BA)
- Occupation: Diplomat

Lawrence Anthony Pezzullo (occasionally alternately spelled as Pezzulo) (May 3, 1926 – July 26, 2017) was an American diplomat and Foreign Service officer. He served as the United States Ambassador to Nicaragua (1979–1981) and to Uruguay (1977–1979). He was also the executive director of Catholic Relief Services from 1983 to 1992.

== Early life and education ==
Pezzullo was born in New York City, and attended high school in Levittown, New York, and Columbia College, from which he graduated in 1951 on a G.I. Bill as a history major.

== Career ==
After college, he taught high school in Levittown, New York for six years before joining the United States Foreign Service. He served in Ciudad Juárez from 1958 to 1960, Saigon from 1962 to 1965, La Paz from 1965 to 1967, Bogotá from 1967 to 1969, and Guatemala from 1969 to 1971.

In 1972, he earned a master's degree from National War College and was assigned to the Office of Central American Affairs at the State Department, before being named deputy director in 1974. From 1975 to 1977, he was the Deputy Assistant Secretary of State for Congressional Relations and was then named the United States Ambassador to Uruguay in 1977.

He served for two years before being appointed as the United States Ambassador to Nicaragua by President Jimmy Carter in 1979. During his tenure as ambassador, Pezzullo negotiated the abdication of Anastasio Somoza DeBayle and paved way for Sandinista rule in the country. Miguel d'Escoto Brockmann, foreign minister of Nicaragua, once said that Pezzullo was "the best U.S. ambassador to Nicaragua in this century" for ''trying to help his government understand the irreversibility of the process here and seek a modus vivendi with" the Sandinistas.

Pezzullo also served as ambassador to Uruguay from 1977 to 1979.

In 1983, he was appointed as the first layman director of the international Catholic Relief Services and helped relocate the headquarters of the organization from New York City to Baltimore.

After leaving Catholic Relief Services, Pezzullo was named special envoy to Haiti by President Bill Clinton in 1993 with the aim of brokering a transition from military to civilian rule. However, the effort was unsuccessful and he stepped down from the position a year later.

He served as the diplomat-in-residence at University of Georgia and lectured at Goucher College.

== Personal life ==
He married Josephine DiMattia in February 1950 and with her has three children. Pezzulo died on July 26, 2017, at the age of 91. He was survived by his wife, three children, and seven grandchildren.

Diplomatic posts
Preceded by Ernest V. Siracusa	United States Ambassador to Uruguay; 1977–1979	Succeeded by Lyle Franklin Lane
Preceded by Mauricio Solaún	United States Ambassador to Nicaragua; 1979–1981	Succeeded by Anthony Cecil Eden Quainton
