= Ernest V. Siracusa =

American diplomat

Ernest Siracusa

United States Ambassador to Bolivia
- In office December 5, 1969 – July 30, 1973
- President: Richard Nixon
- Preceded by: Raúl Héctor Castro
- Succeeded by: William Perry Stedman, Jr.

United States Ambassador to Uruguay
- In office September 25, 1973 – April 22, 1977
- President: Richard Nixon; Gerald Ford; Jimmy Carter
- Preceded by: Charles Wallace Adair
- Succeeded by: Lawrence Pezzullo

Personal details
- Born: Ernest Victor Siracusa; November 30, 1918 Coalinga, California, U.S.
- Died: April 26, 2000 (aged 81) Austin, Texas, U.S.
- Education: Stanford University (BA)
- Occupation: Diplomat

Ernest Victor Siracusa (November 30, 1918 – April 26, 2000) was an American diplomat. A career Foreign Service Officer, he served as U.S. Ambassador Extraordinary and Plenipotentiary to Bolivia (1969–1973) and Uruguay (1973–1977).

== Early life and education ==
Siracusa was born in Coalinga, California on November 30, 1918. From 1936 to 1938 Ernest Siracusa attended Fullerton Junior College. Siracusa graduated from Stanford University in 1940 and spent a year studying economics at MIT.

== Career ==
On March 20, 1941 he entered the foreign service and on July 16, 1941 he became Vice Consul in Mexico City, where on November 1, 1941 he was promoted to Embassy Secretary 3rd Class. On March 25, 1943, he became Vice Consul in La Ceiba.

From June 3, 1945 to March 15, 1946, he was employed by the United States Navy. On June 19, 1946, he became Vice Consul in Guatemala. From 1952 to 1956 he was employed in Buenos Aires as a political official at Eva Perón's funeral service. He accompanied Milton S. Eisenhower's mission in Latin America. He reported on the excommunication of Juan Perón and a fire at the US embassy in Buenos Aires. On March 2, 1959, during Hernán Siles Zuazo's second term, Time magazine quoted that Bolivia and the headache it caused were best shared among neighboring countries. Time was able to report on the protests in La Paz 14 days later.

From 1960 to 1962 he was employed in Rome. He advised on the storage of weapons and reported that such weapons should be used against him. From 1961 to 1962 he advised Adlai Ewing Stevenson on the subject of Latin America. From 1963 to 1969 he worked in Lima. On November 10, 1969, he was appointed Ambassador to La Paz, where he was accredited from December 5, 1969 to July 30, 1973. On July 16, 1973, he was appointed ambassador to Montevideo, where he was accredited from September 25, 1973 to April 22, 1977.

In August 1976, Siracusa refused to transmit a demarche against plans, subversives, politicians and celebrities to the rulers in Montevideo and asked for instructions. On August 30, 1976, the Assistant Secretary of State Harry W. Shlaudeman wrote a memorandum to Operation Condor and proposed to negotiate with Secretary of State Juan Carlos Blanco Estradé and General Julio César Vadora (1974-1978). In a telegram from Lusaka on September 16, 1976, Henry Kissinger instructed Shlaudeman to stop pursuing the efforts.

== Personal life and death ==
Siracusa died in Austin, Texas on April 26, 2000, at the age of 81.

Diplomatic posts
Preceded by Raúl Héctor Castro	United States Ambassador to Bolivia; 1969–1973	Succeeded by William Perry Stedman, Jr.
Preceded by Charles Wallace Adair	United States Ambassador to Uruguay; 1973–1977	Succeeded by Lawrence Pezzullo
