= Barbara Moore (ambassador) =

American diplomat

- Born: 1952 (age 72–73); Buffalo, New York, United States
- Died: March 11, 2010 (aged 58); Silver Spring, Maryland, United States
- Occupation: diplomat

Barbara Calandra Moore (1952 – March 11, 2010) was a United States diplomat who served as United States Ambassador to Nicaragua.

Moore was nominated to be Ambassador to the Republic of Nicaragua by President George W. Bush in May 2002. She arrived in Nicaragua September 12, 2002 and presented credentials to President Enrique Bolaños on September 13, 2002.

Moore was a career member of the Senior Foreign Service, class of Minister Counselor. She joined the United States Information Agency in 1974. Her most recent assignment before being nominated as Ambassador to Nicaragua was as Deputy Chief of Mission at the U.S. Embassy in Bogotá, Colombia (1998–2002), where she played a major role in the conception and implementation of Plan Colombia.

Her previous assignments with the United States Information Agency (before its merger with the Department of State) include tours as Information Officer in Caracas, Venezuela (1989–93); Counselor for Public Affairs in Santiago, Chile (1993–97); and Deputy Director of USIA's Office of Western Hemisphere Affairs (1997–98). She also held positions in Mexico City; Toronto, Ontario, Canada; and in USIA's Bureau of Programs in Washington, D.C.

A native of Buffalo, New York, Moore received a B.A. degree from the College of New Rochelle (1973). Her husband was Spencer B. Moore of Portland, Oregon, and they had one son.

Diplomatic posts
Preceded by Oliver P. Garza	United States Ambassador to Nicaragua; 2002–2005	Succeeded by Paul A. Trivelli
