= Kennedy M. Crockett =

American diplomat

Kennedy McCampbell Crockett (January 18, 1920, in Kingsville, Texas – May 3, 2001, in Kingsville, Texas ) was an American diplomat who was the United States Ambassador to Nicaragua from 1967 until April 19, 1970.

Diplomatic posts
Preceded by Aaron S. Brown	United States Ambassador to Nicaragua; 1967–1970	Succeeded by Turner B. Shelton
