= Paul A. Trivelli =

American diplomat

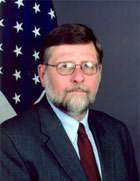

United States Ambassador to Nicaragua
- In office September 9, 2005 – August 6, 2008
- President: George W. Bush
- Preceded by: Barbara C. Moore
- Succeeded by: Robert J. Callahan

Paul Arthur Trivelli (born 1953) is a United States diplomat and career foreign service officer. As of 2008, he is serving as the foreign policy advisor to Admiral James G. Stavridis, Commander of United States Southern Command. Prior to his current posting, he was the United States Ambassador to Nicaragua 2005–08.

Trivelli graduated from Williams College with a Bachelor of Arts degree in biology in 1974 and from the Josef Korbel School of International Studies at the University of Denver with a Master of Arts degree in international studies in 1978. He entered the Foreign Service in 1978 and for most of his career has served as an Economic/Commercial Officer. He has been posted to Mexico City, the U.S. Department of State's Bureau of Western Hemisphere Affairs, Quito, Panama City, El Salvador, Monterrey, and Managua. In 1996, Trivelli received a M.A. in national security studies from the Naval War College. From 1998 to 2002, Trivelli served as Deputy Chief of Mission of the U.S. Embassy in Tegucigalpa, Honduras. He was director of the Office of Central American Affairs from July 2002 to November 2003.

Trivelli was announced as the nominee of President George W. Bush to be the U.S. ambassador to Nicaragua on May 13, 2005. The nomination was sent to the Senate on May 16 and was confirmed on May 26.

Trivelli was the source of much controversy for his remarks about the 2006 Nicaraguan presidential election and his warnings about U.S. economic retaliation if Sandinista candidate Daniel Ortega won the election. Specifically, he expressed the desire of the United States government to see the split conservative parties unite behind a single candidate, even going so far as to offer to fund such a joint primary election. Additionally, he explicitly threatened to cut off $175 million in Millennium Challenge Account funding.

== Notes ==
Diplomatic posts
Preceded by Barbara C. Moore	United States Ambassador to Nicaragua; 2005–2008	Succeeded by Robert J. Callahan
