= Benjamin Lafayette Jefferson =

American politician

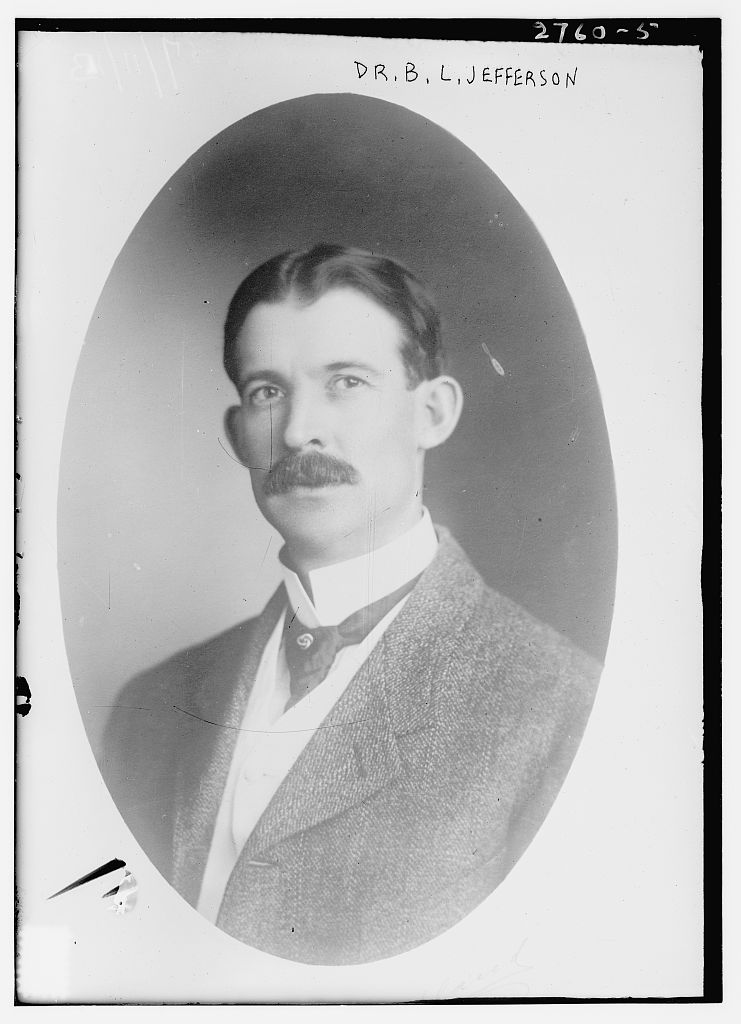
Benjamin Lafayette Jefferson circa 1913-1915

Benjamin Lafayette Jefferson (October 26, 1871 – 1950) in 1913 was United States Envoy Extraordinary and Minister Plenipotentiary of Nicaragua appointed by Woodrow Wilson.

== Biography ==
He was born in Columbus, Georgia on October 26, 1871 to Rollin Jefferson and Metta Virginia Harp. He married Clarinte B. Duquette on December 21, 1898. He was a Democrat and a dentist. Jefferson was member of Colorado House of Representatives from 1898 to 1900 and a member of Colorado State Senate from 1900 to 1908. Presidential Elector for Colorado, 1908; U.S. Minister to Nicaragua, 1913-1921. He was an unsuccessful candidate in the primary for the Governor of Colorado in 1922. delegate to Democratic National Convention from Colorado, 1928. Methodist. Member, Freemasons. He died in 1950. He lived in Steamboat Springs, Colorado, and was a physician. He was a Register of the Colorado Lands Board, and was for several years in the Colorado State Senate.
