= George T. Weitzel =

American diplomat

George T. Weitzel (1873–1936) was a non-career appointee Envoy Extraordinary and Minister Plenipotentiary to Nicaragua, appointed in 1911, who was allowed to join without taking the exam because of his years as secretary to legations in Panama, Nicaragua, Costa Rica and Division of Latin American Affairs at the Washington, DC office.

A civil war had been going on during Weitzel's tenure and at the request of President Adolfo Díaz Recinos, Weitzel arranged for American Marines to intervene.

Weitzel graduated from Harvard University (1894) and Harvard Law School (1897).

George T. Weitzel was a signatory of the Chamorro-Weitzel Treaty, signed in Managua by the Minister of Foreign Affairs, Diego Manuel Chamorro, and he as the North American Minister accredited in Managua on February 8, 1913. This treaty was pending approval in the North American Senate. for some time during which the Republican party, lost power in the United States of America and was elected President Woodrow Wilson who appointed William Jennings Bryan Secretary of State.

The treaty celebrated in Managua had been sponsored by the government of William Howard Taft, with Philander Chase Knox, Secretary of State, both Republicans and it did not have a good environment under the new democratic regime which began by repudiating the policy of the dollar and every act of the past administration. The Democratic leader of the Senate Relations Committee was Senator Bacon who led a systematic democratic opposition against all the acts of the previous Republican Government, so this is the political explanation why the Chamorro-Weitzell Treaty was not approved in the Senate American.
