= April 1900 =

Month in 1900

<<	April 1900					>>
Su	Mo	Tu	We	Th	Fr	Sa
1	2	3	4	5	6	7
8	9	10	11	12	13	14
15	16	17	18	19	20	21
22	23	24	25	26	27	28
29	30

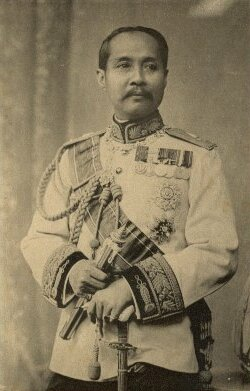
April 23, 1900: King Chulalongkorn frees the serfs of Thailand

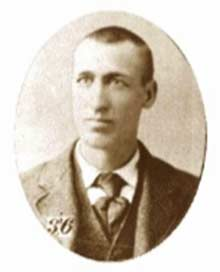
April 30, 1900: "Casey" Jones wrecks train, becomes immortalized in song

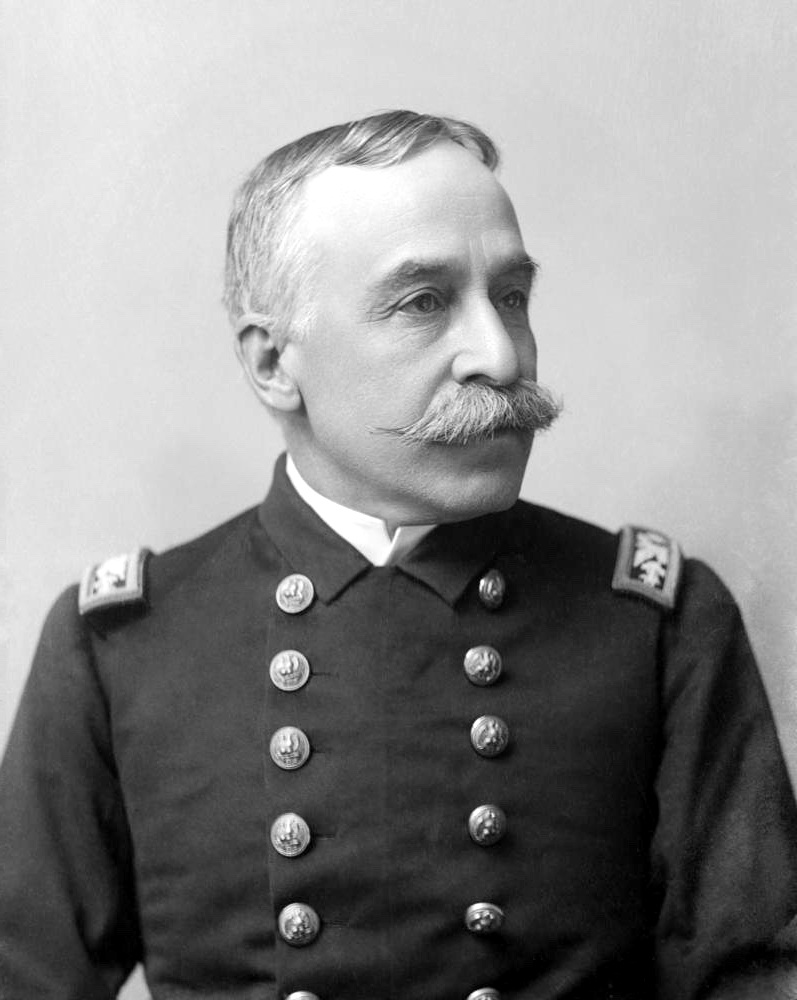
April 3, 1900: Admiral Dewey runs for president, says he is convinced that the job "is not a very difficult one"

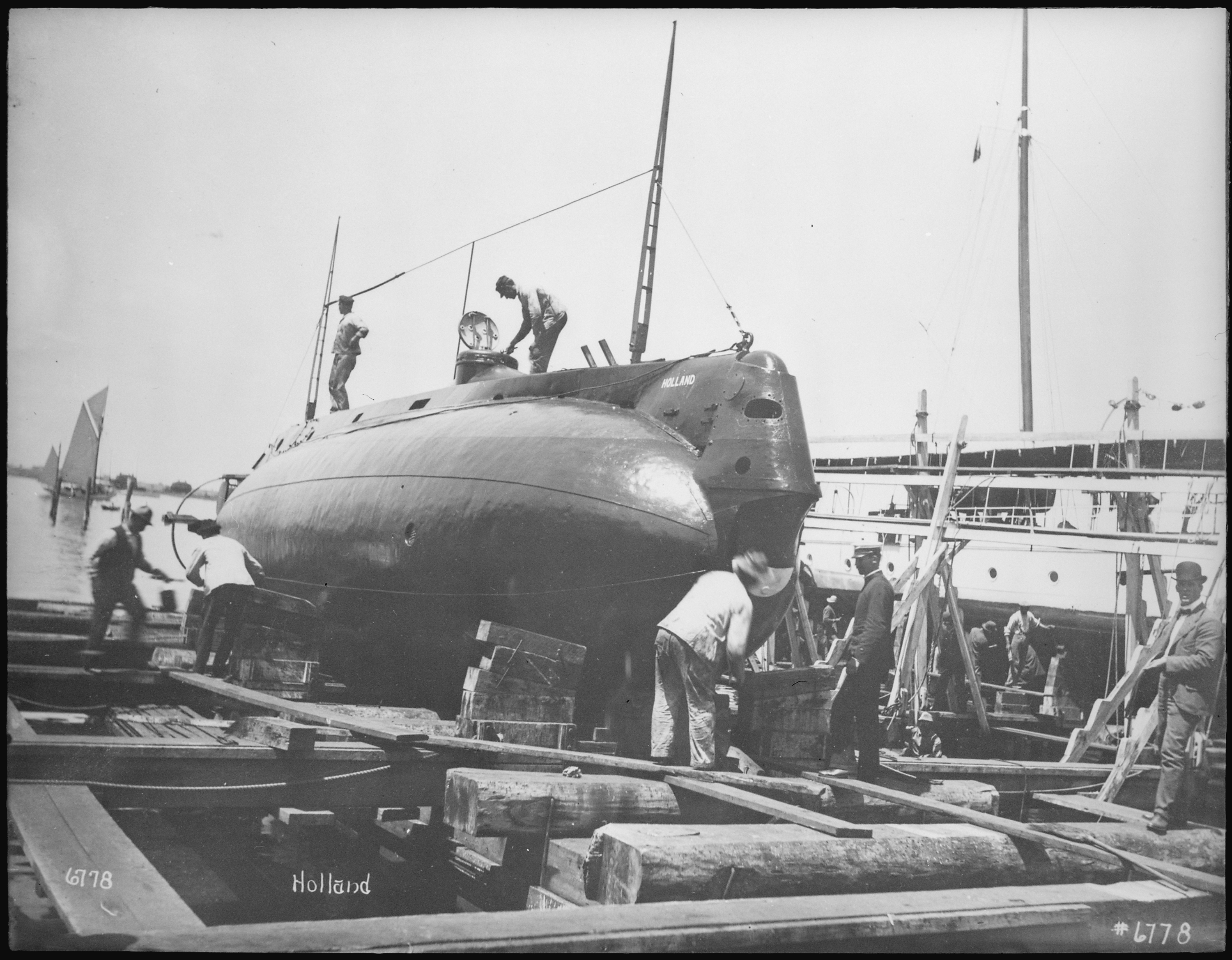
April 11, 1900: U.S. Navy acquires its first submarine, USS Holland

The following events occurred in April 1900:

== April 1, 1900 (Sunday) ==
- Bayern Munich played its first game, defeating the MTV 1879 club, 7–1.
- RWE AG, Germany's largest electrical power company, began supplying electricity, starting with the city of Düsseldorf.

== April 2, 1900 (Monday) ==
- The associate degree was created by the University of Chicago, and granted to fifteen students who had completed their freshman and sophomore years.
- Meeting at the Waldorf Astoria Hotel in New York City, the Automobile Club of America announced its plans to push for the construction of a transcontinental road to run from New York City to San Francisco.

== April 3, 1900 (Tuesday) ==
- Admiral George Dewey, hero of the Spanish–American War, announced his candidacy for President of the United States, bringing the cancellation of a celebrated tour of the United States. In an exclusive interview with the New York World, Dewey made the mistake of saying, "I am convinced that the office of the president is not a very difficult one to fill, his duties mainly to execute the laws of congress." Dewey withdrew his candidacy the next month, after revealing that he had never voted in an election.
- The United States Senate passed the Foraker Act, providing for the government of Puerto Rico, 49–31, and sent the measure to the House of Representatives, which approved it 161–153.
- Born: Camille Chamoun, Lebanese state leader, second President of Lebanon; in Deir al-Qamar, Ottoman Empire (d. 1987)

== April 4, 1900 (Wednesday) ==
- In Brussels, an assassin fired two shots at the Prince of Wales (the future King Edward VII) as the Prince's railroad car was preparing to leave Brussels-North railway station for Copenhagen. Identified as a 16-year-old Jean-Baptiste Sipido, the would-be killer, protesting against the Second Boer War, jumped upon the footboard of the carriage and fired through the window, but missed. Sipido was tried and acquitted, and lived until 1959.
- The Convention Hall in Kansas City, which was three months away from hosting the Democratic Convention, was destroyed in a fire that consumed the building in 30 minutes.
- Queen Victoria visited her subjects in Dublin, Ireland (at the time, a part of the United Kingdom of Great Britain and Ireland) after landing the night before at Kingstown on the yacht Victoria and Albert.
- At Reddersburg in South Africa, Boer troops led by General Christiaan de Wet forced the surrender of the Royal Irish Rifles after a 24-hour battle, taking 546 prisoners.

== April 5, 1900 (Thursday) ==
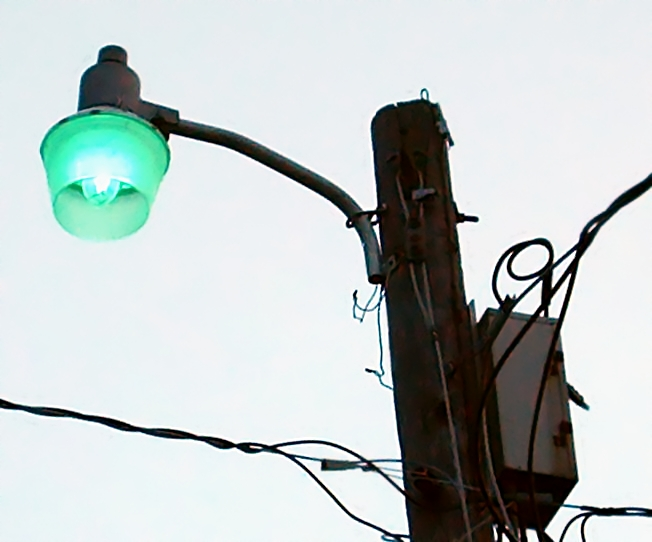
A mercury-vapor lamp

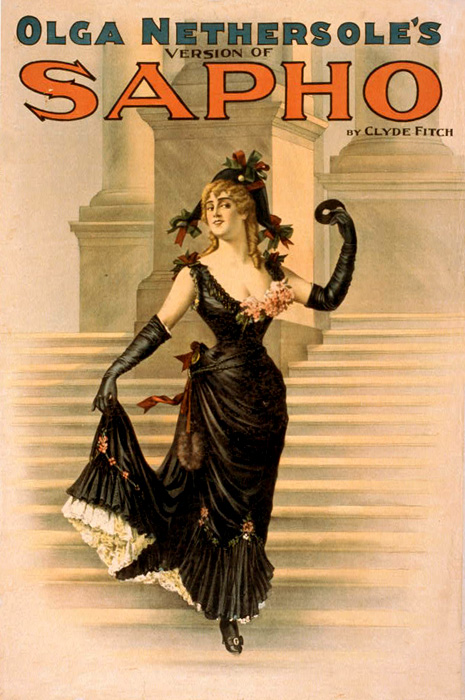
Sapho

- The patent application for the first mercury-vapor lamp, now commonplace in street lights around the world because of its longevity and luminescence, was filed by American inventor Peter Cooper Hewitt. U.S. Patent No. 682,692 would be granted on September 17, 1901.
- Olga Nethersole was acquitted by a jury of charges of public nuisance, arising from the performance of the play Sapho. Two days later, Sapho was being presented again on Broadway for 55 more performances.
- The Irish Guards were created by command of Queen Victoria to commemorate the bravery of Irish forces in South Africa.
- Born: Spencer Tracy, American actor, recipient of two consecutive Academy Awards for Best Actor for Captains Courageous and Boys Town; in Milwaukee (d. 1967)

== April 6, 1900 (Friday) ==
- World heavyweight boxing champion Jim Jeffries retained his title in a bout that lasted only 55 seconds. In Detroit, challenger Jack Finnegan was TKO'd less than a minute into the first round, a record that still stands. Finnegan, who was outweighed by Jeffries 250 pounds to 180, got up after each of three knockdowns before the towel was thrown in. In 1988, Mike Tyson would KO Michael Spinks in 91 seconds, the last heavyweight title fight to be decided in the first round.
- The city of Havana, Cuba banned the playing of African drums, a prohibition that remained in effect until 1940, when conga drums again became part of Cuban music.
- Kentucky's highest court declared J. C. W. Beckham to be the Governor, ruling against William S. Taylor. Taylor had been sworn in as Governor earlier in the year after being certified the winner of the 1899 state election, but a lower court ruled William Goebel to be the winner. Goebel was assassinated, and Lt. Governor Beckham was sworn in during February.

== April 7, 1900 (Saturday) ==
- More than 100 people were killed near Austin, Texas, when the McDonald Dam burst at 11:15 in the morning and sent a torrent of waters from the Colorado River rushing through the state capital. The dam had been constructed only seven years earlier, and burst following four days of rain. The town of Circleville was reported to have been washed away. Flooding of the Concho River had destroyed the town of Watervalley the day before.
- At Thomas Edison's laboratory, an agent of the Goldschmidt Chemische-Thermo Industrie of Essen, Germany, demonstrated a process to melt iron in five seconds. "Louis Dreyfus of Frankfort-on-Main ... showed Mr. Edison his new process for attaining an enormous degree of heat in an incredibly short period of time by the combustion of a certain chemical compound which the inventor keeps a secret," The New York Times reported, "then placed a six-inch long iron wrench in a crucible and created a fire that reached 3,000 degrees centigrade."
- General Arthur MacArthur was named to replace General Elwell Stephen Otis as military governor of the Philippines.
- The gunboat USS Wheeling arrived at Taku Forts to reinforce the American military presence in China.

== April 8, 1900 (Sunday) ==
- In the first major event associated with the introduction of Buddhism to the United States, The Buddha's birthday was celebrated in an elaborate ceremony in San Francisco. The Buddhist mission had begun its outreach to European-Americans in weekly lectures beginning on January 4.

== April 9, 1900 (Monday) ==
- In a session of the Académie des Sciences in Paris, physicist Paul Ulrich Villard presented the paper "Sur la reflexion et la refraction des rayons cathodiques et des rayons deviables du radium", describing, for the first time gamma ray radiation that penetrated through shielding.

== April 10, 1900 (Tuesday) ==
- The Supreme Court of Ohio upheld the constitutionality of the first anti-lynching law in the United States. Passed in 1896, the "Act for the Suppression of Mob Violence" permitted damages to be recovered from a local government for negligence in preventing a person from being lynched.
- Died: Frank Hamilton Cushing, 42, ethnologist for the Smithsonian Institution and expert on the Zuni Indian culture, after choking on a fishbone.

== April 11, 1900 (Wednesday) ==
- King Leopold of Belgium, by declaration made on April 9, turned over to the nation all of his properties "which contribute to the charms and beauty of the localities in which they are situated" on condition that they be preserved as park land, creating the Royal Trust of Belgium. More were turned over in 15 November 1900.
- The United States Navy purchased its first submarine, the USS Holland, for $150,000. Commissioned on October 12, the sub was 50 feet (15 m) long, held a crew of six, and ran on electric batteries when submerged.

== April 12, 1900 (Thursday) ==
- U.S. President William McKinley signed into law "An Act Providing a Civil Government for Porto Rico", also called the Foraker Act, and appointed Charles Herbert Allen as the first American Governor of Puerto Rico.
- James Richard Cocke, 70, an American physician who pioneered alternative medicine including homeopathy and hypnotherapy, killed himself with a gunshot to the head.

== April 13, 1900 (Friday) ==
- For the fourth time since 1893, the United States House of Representatives passed a resolution to provide that U.S. senators be elected by popular vote rather than by the individual state legislatures, by a margin of 242–15. As with the previous resolutions, the measure failed in the Senate. It was not until 1913 that the law changed, by the amendment of the United States Constitution.
- At Knossos, workmen first excavated the royal palace of Minos.

== April 14, 1900 (Saturday) ==
- French President Émile Loubet formally opened the Paris World Exhibition. The fair would close on November 12. The first Michelin Guide was published to coincide with the opening of the exposition and the first modern step-type escalator, designed by Charles Seeberger, was in use.
- The Automobile Club of America staged the first car race in U.S. history, a 50-mile (80 km) race on Long Island, starting at 10:00 am in Springfield to Babylon, New York, and back. As one of nine drivers, A.L. Riker won the race in 2 hours, 3 1/2 minutes, and a silver cup provided by Leonce Blanchet.
- The Union Cycliste Internationale (UCI), the controlling body for bicycling events around the world, was founded in Switzerland.
- Charlie Williams, playing for Manchester City against Sunderland, became the first goalkeeper to score a goal in the history of the English Football League.
- Born: Nina Kukharchuk-Khrushcheva, wife of Nikita Khrushchev (d. 1984)
- Died: Osman Nuri Pasha, Ottoman army officer, field marshal and hero of the Siege of Plevna (b. 1832)

== April 15, 1900 (Sunday) ==
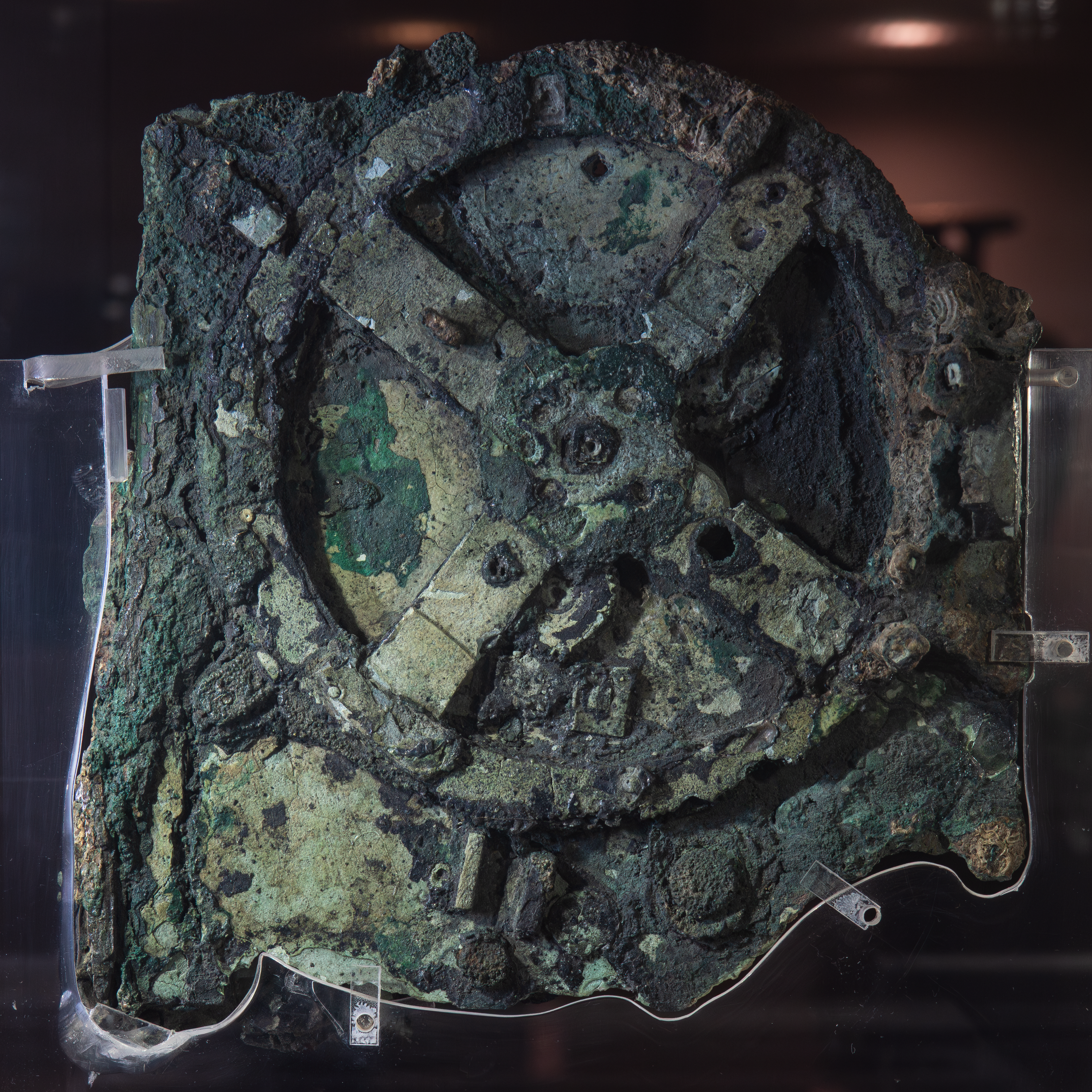
The Antikythera mechanism (main fragment), an early analog computing device.

- American troops in the Philippines sustained their heaviest one-day loss of the year as 19 soldiers in the 43rd Infantry were killed at the Siege of Catubig on the first day of battle. The United States Department of War reported that 200 insurgents were killed on the same day.
- At or near Easter, the Antikythera mechanism, an ancient computer used to calculate astronomical positions, was found by Elias Stadiatos, a sponge fisherman.
- Milan played its first official football match, losing to Torino, 3–0. The club had won a warmup game against Mediolanum on March 11, 3–0.

== April 16, 1900 (Monday) ==
- The first book of stamps in the United States was placed on sale in American post offices. According to the 1900 report of the United States Postmaster General, "These books are issued in three sizes, containing, respectively, 12, 24, and 48 2-cent stamps in sheets of six stamps each, with paraffined paper interleaved between the sheets ..."
- Born: Polly Adler, famed brothel operator in New York City, recounted in A House Is Not a Home; in Yanow, Russian Empire (d. 1962)

== April 17, 1900 (Tuesday) ==
- The chiefs of Tutuila, led by Chief Mauga of Pago Pago, voted to approve cession of the island to the United States, and presented a deed to be taken to the U.S. president. The courtesy of a reply was not received until January 16, 1903. Commander B.F. Tilley raised the American flag at Pago Pago.
- George Curry, member of Butch Cassidy's Wild Bunch gang, was shot and killed by Sheriff Jessie M. Tyler while cattle rustling in Grand County, Utah.

== April 18, 1900 (Wednesday) ==
- In British India, the organization Nagari Pracharini Sabha succeeded in its mission to promote the official recognition of the Devanagari script in official documents. Sir Antony Macdonald, Governor of the United Provinces of Agra and Oudh issued an executive order providing that the Devanagari and Persian scripts be used for government documents, summons and notices.
- In American law as of October 31, 1988, "the term 'Native American Samoan' means a person who is a citizen or national of the United States and who is a lineal descendant of an inhabitant of the Samoan Islands on April 18, 1900. For purposes of this section, Swains Island shall be considered part of the Samoan Islands."

== April 19, 1900 (Thursday) ==
- In China, the Empress Dowager Cixi issued an imperial edict to all Chinese viceroys and governors, directing them to in turn issue warnings to the Boxers and other armed groups to refrain from "hostile and lawless acts toward native Christians", subject to severe punishment. However, the Empress issued another edict prohibiting soldiers from firing on Boxers.
- The first anti-Japanese meeting was held in the United States, taking place in Seattle.
- The 1900 National League baseball season opened, with all eight teams playing. For the first time, home plate was a five-sided base, pointing toward the pitcher's mound.

== April 20, 1900 (Friday) ==
- Niue, also known as Savage Island, was made a British protectorate at the request of its ruler, King Fataaiki. The South Pacific island was annexed to New Zealand in 1901.
- Joseph Wheeler resigned as Congressman for Alabama's 8th congressional district. As a brigadier general in the United States Army, Wheeler had been absent from the state and stationed in the Philippines since 1899.
- Leo Alexandroff, a Russian sailor on the ship Variag, defected to the United States while in New York City. Though he was arrested by American authorities on charges of desertion, at the request of the Russian government, the United States refused to turn him over, citing an exception to its treaty of extradition.

== April 21, 1900 (Saturday) ==
- Queen Makea Takau and Chief Ngamaru Ariki of Rarotonga formally petitioned for the Cook Islands to be made part of the British Empire without any connection to New Zealand. Nevertheless, the islands were annexed to New Zealand in 1901.
- Born: Hans Fritzsche, German state official, director of the Reich Ministry of Public Enlightenment and Propaganda in Nazi Germany; in Cologne (d. 1953)

== April 22, 1900 (Sunday) ==
- In the Battle of Kousséri, in Chad, French forces commanded by Major Amédée-François Lamy finally defeated the forces of Rabih az-Zubayr after two years of war, bringing Chad under the jurisdiction of French Equatorial Africa. Both Lamy and Rabih were killed in the battle. The capital city of Chad was named Fort-Lamy in honor of the French commander, until renamed N'Djamena in 1973.

== April 23, 1900 (Monday) ==
- King Chulalongkorn of Siam (now Thailand) decreed an end to the phrai system, a form of serfdom in rural provinces.
- The United States Senate Committee on Privileges and Elections unanimously approved a report to the Senate recommending that the election of Senator William A. Clark of Montana be declared null and void. Clark would resign on May 11, bringing an end to debate in the Senate.
- According to one source, the word "hillbilly" was introduced on this date, appearing in the New York Journal.
- The town of Pánuco, Veracruz in Mexico was destroyed by fire, leaving more than 2,000 homeless.

== April 24, 1900 (Tuesday) ==
- By a vote of 33 to 32, the United States Senate refused to allow Matthew Quay to take office as Senator from Pennsylvania. The roll was called at 4:00 in the afternoon, with Senator Wellington of Michigan casting the deciding vote.
- The Daily Express, an afternoon tabloid newspaper in London, published its first issue and would become, during part of the 20th century, "the biggest selling newspaper in the world". Founded by Sir Arthur Pearson, the Express was the first British newspaper to use the front page for news headlines instead of advertisements.

== April 25, 1900 (Wednesday) ==
- Captain Umberto Cagni of Italy and his crew of ten men and 102 dogs reached a point further north than mankind had ever been before. Cagni, part of the North Pole expedition of the Duke of Abruzzi, planted the Italian flag at 86°34' N and then turned back.
- William H. King was sworn in as the U.S. representative from Utah, filling the seat that had been denied B. H. Roberts. Because of Utah's sparse population, King was the state's sole member of the House.
- Born: Wolfgang Pauli, Austrian physicist, winner of Nobel Prize in Physics in 1945, for formulating the Pauli exclusion principle; in Vienna (d. 1958)

== April 26, 1900 (Thursday) ==
- The city of Hull, Quebec, and the western side of Ottawa, were destroyed by a kitchen fire that broke out in a Bank Street restaurant during the morning and by 11:30, swept north towards Hull's Main Street and through the lumber mills. By 1:00 in the afternoon, the flames spread over the Ottawa River to the Chaudiere Flats section of the Canadian capital. The property loss was estimated at $15,000,000 (c. $300 million in 2008 monies) and twelve thousand people were left homeless, though only seven people were killed.
- Guglielmo Marconi was awarded British patent No. 7,777 for wireless radio.
- President Manuel Antonio Sanclemente of Colombia extended the deadline for completion of the Panama Canal from October 31, 1904, to October 31, 1910. The executive decree was granted without consent of the Colombian Congress.
- Born:
  - Charles Richter, American physicist, who devised the Richter magnitude scale, by which earthquakes are measured; in Hamilton, Ohio (d. 1985)
  - Roberto Arlt, Argentine writer and journalist; in Buenos Aires (d. 1942)

== April 27, 1900 (Friday) ==
- Hannibal Sehested replaced Hugo Egmont Hørring as Prime Minister of Denmark.
- Newly appointed Governor of Puerto Rico Charles Herbert Allen arrived at San Juan on the USS Dolphin.
- United States Secretary of War Elihu Root surprised an audience at a banquet when he predicted that the United States would go to war in a few years. Speaking at the Waldorf Astoria Hotel, where the birthday of the late General Ulysses S. Grant was being celebrated, Root said that "The American people will, within a few years, have to either abandon the Monroe doctrine, or fight for it, and we are not going to abandon it. If necessary we will fight for it, but unless there is greater diligence in legislation, in the future than in the past, when the time comes it may find us unprepared."

== April 28, 1900 (Saturday) ==
- The wife of Major General James H. Wilson, Military Governor of the Matanzas-Santa Clara Department of Cuba, was killed in a freak accident in Havana. Mrs. Wilson alighted from a carriage and stepped on a match that had been burning in the street, and her dress caught fire. She died shortly thereafter of her burns.
- Alfred M. Jones, a noted 70-year-old engraver who had attained worldwide fame, was killed when a cab struck him on Fifth Avenue in New York City. Jones was walking to a dinner engagement at the Century Club at the Waldorf Astoria Hotel. He died at the New York Hospital of a fractured skull.
- Born:
  - Heinrich Müller, German state official, Chief of the Gestapo during World War II; in Munich (disappeared in 1945)
  - Jan Oort, Dutch astronomer, pioneer in radio astronomy; in Franeker (d. 1992)

== April 29, 1900 (Sunday) ==
- An accident at the Paris World Exposition killed nine people and injured forty. Because of repairs to a bridge that led to the Celestial Globe, a temporary plaster footbridge had been constructed.
- The National League's St. Louis team was first referred to in print as the "Cardinals", mentioned in a report in the St. Louis Post-Dispatch.

== April 30, 1900 (Monday) ==
- "On April 30, 1900, that rainy morn, Down in Mississippi near the town of Vaughn, Sped the Cannonball Special only two minutes late, Traveling" 70 miles (110 km) "an hour when they saw a freight." Songwriter Wallace Saunders would immortalize "a relatively minor disaster on the Illinois Central" in "The Ballad of Casey Jones". John Luther "Casey" Jones, driving a passenger train from Memphis, Tennessee, to Canton, Mississippi, was speeding when he encountered two stalled freight trains on the main track at Vaughan, Mississippi. Although he was unable to avoid a collision, Jones slowed the train sufficiently that he was the only fatality of the accident, which happened at 3:42 a.m.
- At 12:40 in the afternoon, U.S. President William McKinley signed into law "An act to provide a government for the Territory of Hawaii". All persons who had been citizens of Hawaii as of April 12, 1898, were declared to be citizens of the United States. By its terms, the law was to take effect on June 14, 1900.
