= May 1900 =

Month in 1900

<<	May 1900					>>
Su	Mo	Tu	We	Th	Fr	Sa
		1	2	3	4	5
6	7	8	9	10	11	12
13	14	15	16	17	18	19
20	21	22	23	24	25	26
27	28	29	30	31

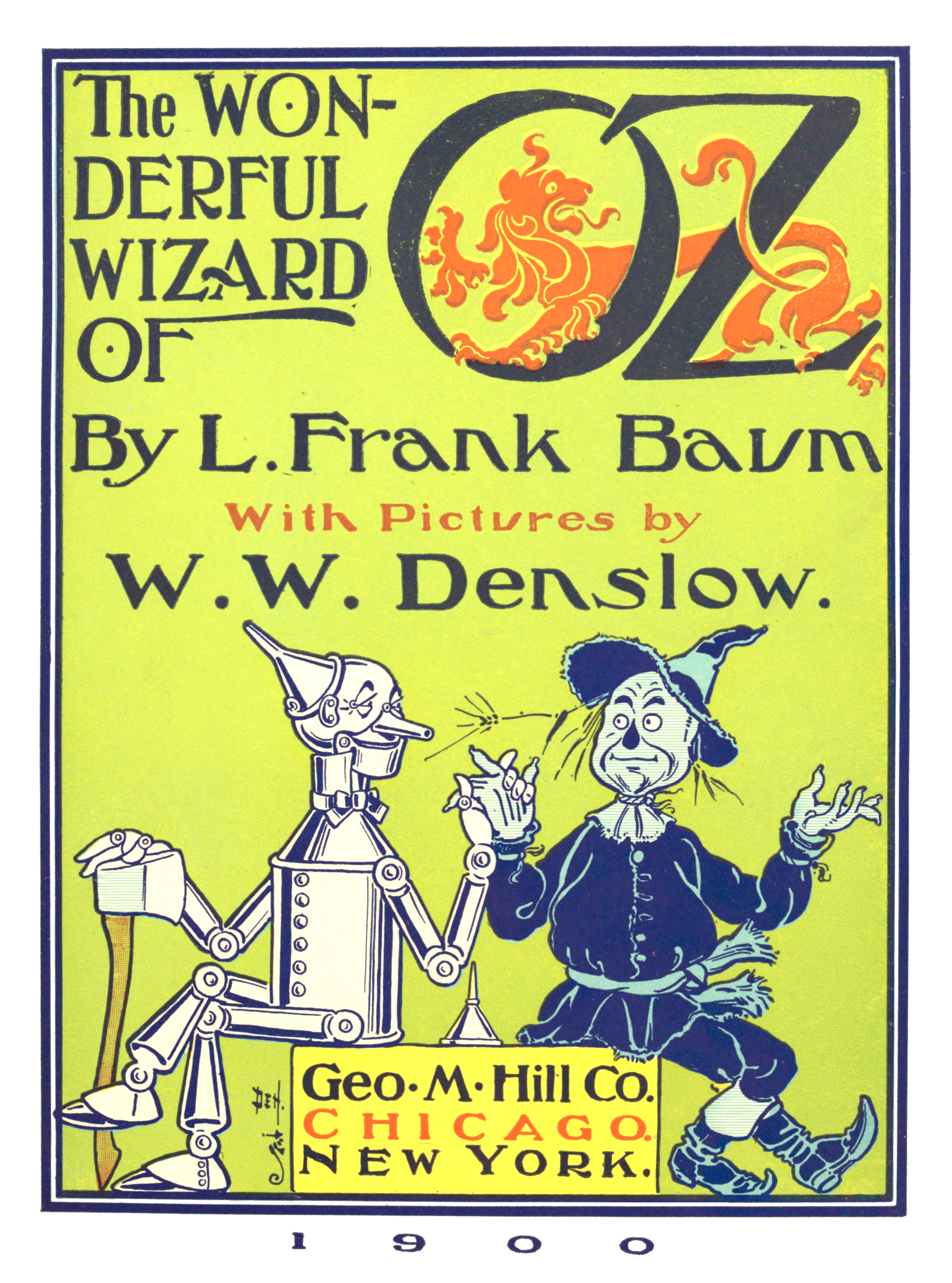
May 17, 1900: The Wonderful Wizard of Oz published

May 28, 1900: United Kingdom conquers Orange Free State

The following events occurred in May 1900:

== May 1, 1900 (Tuesday) ==
- Ottoman Sultan Abdul Hamid issued an imperial edict for the construction of the Hejaz railway, to link Damascus to the holy cities of Mecca and Medina.
- Thousands of Russian workers marched in the streets of Kharkov, the first in what would be a series of large protests in Russia's cities.
- Military rule of Puerto Rico by the United States ended. Charles Herbert Allen was sworn in as the American territorial governor, replacing military governor George Whitefield Davis.
- An explosion killed 246 coal miners by carbon monoxide poisoning. The blast, at 10:28 pm at the Pleasant Valley Coal Company near Scofield, Utah, sent CO into two different shafts.
- Born: Ignazio Silone, Italian writer; in Pescina (d. 1978)

== May 2, 1900 (Wednesday) ==
- The Hepburn Bill for construction of the proposed Nicaragua Canal passed the United States House of Representatives by a vote of 225–35, but would end up stalling in the United States Senate. The bill proposed American purchase of land in Costa Rica and Nicaragua to build a canal from Greytown, Nicaragua on the Caribbean to Breto on the Pacific.

== May 3, 1900 (Thursday) ==
- Negotiations between Denmark and the United States for purchase of what would become the Virgin Islands fell through. The Danish West Indies would eventually be sold to America in 1917.
- Harry Burke, captain of the University of Cincinnati track team, was fatally injured while practicing the pole vault. The pole snapped and the fall broke Burke's thoracic spine. He died four days later. (Note: The Scroll gives the day of Burke's injury as May 2.)
- Lord Roberts begins the Advance on Pretoria, moving his troops from Bloemfontein northwards.

== May 4, 1900 (Friday) ==
- Kaiser Wilhelm pledged 500,000 marks to India for famine relief.
- The United States Senate ratified the 1899 amendment to the Geneva Conventions, applying it to naval war.
- In Lubbock, Texas, The Avalanche published its first issue as the city's first major newspaper. Through mergers, it eventually became the Lubbock Avalanche-Journal.
- Died: Augustus Pitt Rivers, 73, British army officer, ethnologist and archaeologist (b. 1827)

== May 5, 1900 (Saturday) ==
- Albert Ellis of the Pacific Islands Company signed a lease with the chiefs of the Banaban people of Ocean Island, a tiny atoll that is now part of the nation of Kiribati, granting the company a 999-year exclusive right to mine phosphate, in exchange for 50 British pounds per year. The islanders, including the misidentified "King of Ocean Island", Temate, did not have the authority to sell mining rights, and were likely not aware of what Ellis intended to do. Following the British annexation of Ocean Island on September 28, 1901, "The British government reduced the term of the lease to a more realistic 99 years".
- General Arthur MacArthur replaced General Elwell Stephen Otis as military governor of the Philippines. The father of General Douglas MacArthur set up his office at the Malacañan Palace in Manila.

== May 6, 1900 (Sunday) ==
- The 18th birthday of Crown Prince Wilhelm of Germany was celebrated in ceremonies at the Royal Chapel in Berlin. Austrian Emperor Franz Joseph named the Crown Prince as Chief of the Hussar regiment. The Prince became Governor of Pomerania and the Prince of Oeis, titles lost after his father was deposed in 1918.

== May 7, 1900 (Monday) ==
- San Francisco Mayor James D. Phelan addressed an anti-Asian rally at Union Square and declared "The Chinese and Japanese are not bonafide citizens. They are not the stuff of which American citizens can be made."
- Mount Vesuvius began erupting, with lava threatening the city of Torre del Greco, Italy.
- Died: Harry Burke, University of Cincinnati track meet captain, due to a fatal injury to his spine after an accident involving the pole vault

== May 8, 1900 (Tuesday) ==
- Richard Etheridge, the first African-American keeper of a Coast Guard station, died while attempting a rescue near the Pea Island Life-Saving Station at North Carolina. He was posthumously awarded the Gold Life Saving Medal for heroism, albeit not until March 5, 1996.
- University of Cambridge zoologist William Bateson was riding a train to London when he read the recently rediscovered 1866 paper by Gregor Mendel, and soon became the greatest champion of Mendel's discoveries of the laws of heredity. As one author would later note, "the first half of genetics was officially underway". Bateson translated Mendel's paper and published it in the 1902 book Mendel's Principles of Heredity: A Defence.
- The National Basket Ball League title was won by the Trenton Nationals, who defeated the Millville Glass Blowers, 22–19, in the third game of the best-of-three championship of the first professional basketball league in the United States.

== May 9, 1900 (Wednesday) ==
- At the annual convention of the American Pharmaceutical Association in Richmond, Virginia, the first organization of pharmacy schools was created. The American Conference on Pharmaceutical Facilities later was renamed the American Association of Colleges of Pharmacy.

== May 10, 1900 (Thursday) ==
- Japan's Crown Prince Yoshihito and Princess Kujo Sadako were married in Tokyo, marking the first Japanese imperial wedding to include a religious ceremony. Soon thereafter, commoners began requesting similar ceremonies and the Shinto wedding soon became popular throughout the nation.
- Responding to the famine in British India, the United States paid for the shipment of donations of 200,000 bushels of corn and substantial quantities of seed, via the ship Quito, which sailed from Brooklyn. Christian Herald editor Louis Klopsch, who had lobbied the government to pay the shipping costs, also cabled $40,000 to India for famine relief.
- British forces encounter Boer resistance at Sand River; after a long fought battle, the British forces put the Boers to flight.

== May 11, 1900 (Friday) ==
- One construction worker was killed, and another severely injured, in a 70-foot (21 m) fall while working on the Manhattan anchorage of the new Williamsburg Bridge.
- Former heavyweight boxing champion "Gentleman Jim" Corbett took on title holder James J. Jeffries, attempting to regain the title that he had lost in 1897, and almost succeeded. In the bout at the New York Athletic Club, Corbett was the better fighter for the first 22 rounds, but in the 23rd, Jeffries knocked him down with a right to the jaw. Corbett's amazing endurance and Jeffries's comeback made the fight a boxing classic.

== May 12, 1900 (Saturday) ==
- Lin Shao-mao who had led a rebellion on the island of Taiwan against its Japanese rulers, surrendered along with his men in a formal ceremony held at Ahou (now Pingtung City). Lin and his men were allowed to live peaceably at Houpilin, but he was eventually killed in a battle on May 30, 1902.
- Field cornet S. Eloff led a force of 240 Boers in an assault on the town of Mafeking, South Africa during the Siege of Mafeking.
- Born: Helene Weigel, Austrian-born German actress, wife of Bertolt Brecht; in Vienna (d. 1971)

== May 13, 1900 (Sunday) ==
- Wilbur Wright wrote to aviation expert Octave Chanute, sharing his own findings and seeking advice on the ideal place to test a flying machine. Written on the letterhead of the Wright Cycle Co. of 1127 West Third Street in Dayton, Ohio, Wright's initial missive began, "For some years I have been afflicted with the belief that flight is possible to man. My disease has increased in severity and I feel that it will soon cost me an increased amount of money, if not my life." Over the next several years, the correspondence continued between Wright and Chanute, whose suggestions aided in the Wright brothers' first flight on December 17, 1903.

== May 14, 1900 (Monday) ==
- The International Olympic Committee staged the second modern Olympic games in Paris, starting with competition held in fencing. There were no opening or closing ceremonies and the games were spread over five months.
- Joseph Chamberlain, Member of Parliament of the United Kingdom and Secretary of State for the Colonies introduced the Australian Commonwealth Bill in the House of Commons. The bill became law on July 9 and Australia became independent on January 1, 1901.
- Born: Leo Smit, Dutch composer; in Amsterdam (d. 1943)

== May 15, 1900 (Tuesday) ==
- Montana's William A. Clark resigned from the United States Senate while that body debated his expulsion. After Clark's name was stricken from the Senate roster, the news came that Montana Lieutenant Governor Archibald E. Spriggs, acting in the absence of Governor Robert Burns Smith, had reappointed Clark to fill the vacancy. When Governor Smith returned, Martin Maginnis was appointed on May 18.
- Fish fell from the sky during a late afternoon thunderstorm in Providence, Rhode Island. Richard H. Tingley, a witness, reported that "streets and yards for several blocks were alive with squirming little perch and bullspouts". The fish were heaviest at Olneyville.

== May 16, 1900 (Wednesday) ==
- Chicago's Chief Milk Inspector, Thomas Grady, announced plans to ban dangerous additives from milk. "Formalin, the chemical used in milk preservatives, will kill a cat", he told reporters. "What will it do to a child?" Formalin, a diluted form of formaldehyde, had been added to raw milk near the end of the 19th century before its toxic effects were realized. The United Kingdom banned the practice in 1901.

== May 17, 1900 (Thursday) ==
- At 3:30 in the morning, the Siege of Mafeking ended after seven months, when Colonel Bryan Mahon led troops to relieve the besieged British residents during the Second Boer War. General Piet Cronjé attacked the city on October 13, 1899, and Colonel Robert Baden-Powell had led the defence.
- At the village of Kaolo "midway between Peking (Beijing) and Paotingfu (Baoding)", 61 Chinese Christian converts were massacred in the worst attack to that time in the Boxer Rebellion. American minister Conger telegraphed, "Situation becoming serious. Request warship Taku soon as possible."
- The first copy of The Wonderful Wizard of Oz, by L. Frank Baum, came off the press. The first run of 10,000 copies sold out prior to publication.

== May 18, 1900 (Friday) ==
- At 9:17 p.m. in London, the Reuters news agency broke the news of the victory at Mafeking, South Africa. As author Phillip Knightley noted, "Britain went mad. The celebrations lasted for five nights, and surpassed the victory celebrations of the First and Second World Wars in size, intensity, and enthusiasm. Baden-Powell became the most popular English hero since Nelson, and a household name not only in Britain but also throughout the United States."

== May 19, 1900 (Saturday) ==
- A day after signing a treaty with King Tupou of Tonga, emissary Basil Thomson declared the South Pacific kingdom to be a protectorate of the United Kingdom. Thomson had spent six weeks in trying to persuade the reluctant King to accept British protection, before threatening to depose the monarch as a last option.
- The Convention for the Preservation of Wild Animals, Birds and Fish in Africa was signed in London by representatives of the European colonial powers, marking the first international agreement to protect wildlife.
- Mining prospector Jim Butler was returning to his home in Belmont, Nevada, when he and his burro stopped to dig at a high canyon near Tonopah. There, he discovered a large outcropping of silver and went from poverty to wealth, while his find set off a mining boom.

== May 20, 1900 (Sunday) ==
- Voters in Switzerland overwhelmingly rejected a law providing for sickness and accident insurance. The Kranken und Unfallversicherungsgesetz (KUVG), sponsored by Ludwig Forrer and passed the Federal Assembly, but was challenged by a referendum, where more than 70% of the voters were against it. Health reform would finally pass in 1911.
- The Free Homes Bill was signed into law by U.S. President William McKinley, and the debts of all homesteaders in Oklahoma were forgiven by the United States government. Up until then, settlers had been compelled to pay, in addition to other requirements, an annual federal fee ranging from $1.00 to $2.50 per acre.
- Born: Sumitranandan Pant, Hindi poet; in Kausani, Punjab Province, British India (now Uttarakhand state (d. 1977)

== May 21, 1900 (Monday) ==
- Plans for the Nicaragua Canal ended when the United States Senate killed it after they declined to bring it up for debate and a vote. While the Hepburn Bill had passed the House, 225–35, Alabama's Senator John Tyler Morgan was unable to persuade the Senate to vote on the matter. A motion to bring an early vote as "unfinished business" failed by a vote of 28–21. A commission then recommended construction of a Panama Canal.
- Following an emergency meeting in Beijing, representatives of the foreign powers (the United States, the United Kingdom, Germany, France and Japan) provided a five-day ultimatum to the Empress Dowager Cixi of China. If the Boxers were not arrested and punished by that time, armies would be sent to invade.

== May 22, 1900 (Tuesday) ==
- At 4:30 in the afternoon, an explosion at the Cumnock Mining Company, near Sanford, North Carolina, killed 22 coal miners. The accident was believed to have been "caused by a broken gauze in a safety lamp".

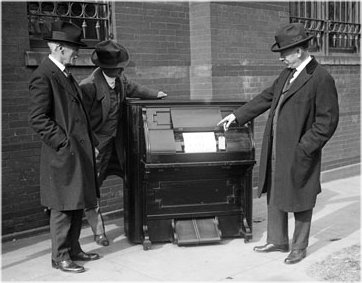
Volney (right) presenting the original Pianola to the Smithsonian Institution in 1922

- The first patent for the "player piano", a self-playing mechanical piano that used a role of perforated paper to guide the movement of the piano keys, was granted to American inventor Edwin S. Votey, who marketed the device under the brand name "Pianola".
- The first test was made of the Adams Air Splitting Train, on a run from Washington, D.C., to Baltimore, then back again. Inventor Frederick Adams had forecast that the aerodynamic, "cigar-shaped" train could be run at a speed of 100 miles per hour (160 km/h) with less expenditure than is now required to keep up a speed of 50 miles per hour (80 km/h). However, the train achieved no more than 60 miles per hour (97 km/h).
- Born: Clyde Tolson, first Associate Director of the Federal Bureau of Investigation and right-hand man of J. Edgar Hoover; in Laredo, Missouri (d. 1975)

== May 23, 1900 (Wednesday) ==
- Nearly thirty-seven years after performing an act of heroism in the American Civil War, Sergeant William Harvey Carney of the 54th Massachusetts Colored Infantry was awarded the Medal of Honor by vote of Congress. Although there had been previous African-American recipients of the Medal, Carney's action on July 18, 1863, preceded that of all other black award winners. The first award of the Medal of Honor to an African-American had been to Robert Blake in 1864.
- The Associated Press was formally incorporated as a New York City corporation. Although several regional corporations had shared news between publishers as early as 1848, an unfavorable ruling by the Supreme Court of Illinois on February 19 led AP clients to form a national organization.
- Born: Hans Frank, German Nazi administrator of the General Government in Poland during World War II; in Karlsruhe (executed 1946)

== May 24, 1900 (Thursday) ==
- The USS Oregon arrived in China at Taku Forts with 28 U.S. Marines and 5 seamen, under the command of Captain John Myers, to protect American citizens during the Boxer Rebellion. The USS Newark followed five days later.
- In Rome, as part of the Feast of the Ascension, Pope Leo canonized Jean-Baptiste de La Salle (1651–1719) and Rita of Cascia (1381–1457). As founder of the Institute of the Brothers of the Christian Schools, de la Salle is considered the patron saint of teachers. Saint Rita of Cascia, the mother of two and wife of an abusive husband, is one of the patron saints for domestic problems.
- Queen Victoria's birthday was celebrated for the last time during her life. The 81-year-old British monarch would die on 22nd January 1901.

== May 25, 1900 (Friday) ==
- The Lacey Act, 16 U.S.C. § 3371–3378, was signed into law by U.S. President William McKinley. Sponsored by conservationist and Iowa Congressman John F. Lacey, the Act was described on its centennial as the "first far-reaching federal wildlife protection law" and one "setting the stage for a century of progress in safeguarding wildlife resources". Its most important provision was to make it a federal crime to ship "wild animals and birds take in defiance of existing state laws" across state lines.

== May 26, 1900 (Saturday) ==
- The Battle of Palonegro concluded after fifteen days in Santander, Colombia, marking a turning point in the Thousand Days' War. General Próspero Pinzón of the Conservative forces defeated Liberal forces commander Gabriel Vargas Santos. An estimated 2,500 people died during the fighting. In January 1901, a pile of hundreds of human skulls would be assembled as a grisly monument that would not be dismantled until 12 years later.

== May 27, 1900 (Sunday) ==
- Pope Leo XIII beatified sixty-four Vietnamese Martyrs. The Vietnamese Martyrs, including 53 others beatified later, were canonized on June 19, 1988.

== May 28, 1900 (Monday) ==
- At noon, the Orange Free State was annexed to the British Empire, in a proclamation at Bloemfontein by its new military governor, Major General George T. Pretyman. Located in South Africa, the Orange Free State had existed as an independent republic from 1854 until Britain's victory in the Second Boer War. President Martinus Theunis Steyn, who had fled Bloemfontein in March, claimed control over the unoccupied areas of the state until surrendering in 1902. Adding an area of 48,326 square miles (125,200 km^{2}) to the Empire, the area was renamed the Orange River Colony. The colony would become part of the Union of South Africa in 1910.
- At the 1900 Paris Exposition, Gare d'Orsay opened as the first electrified urban rail terminal.
- Millions of observers turned out to watch a total eclipse of the sun, visible in a pathway that ran through Mexico and the southeastern United States and to Spain. As the first since the introduction of the Brownie camera, and with more advance publicity than ever before, the eclipse became the most photographed event up to that time. "Amateur photographers throughout the city are making extensive preparations for the event," noted The New York Times, "and it would be hard to estimate the number of snapshots that will be taken to-day." "It has been eleven years since a similar event was witnessed, but the advancement of astronomical science and the marvelous improvements in telescopes, photography, and electrical apparatus insured more complete observations than ever before known." The eclipse began at about 7:26 a.m. Eastern time with totality at 8:36 in the morning.
- Born: Tommy Ladnier, American jazz musician and trumpeter known for promoting Dixieland jazz in Mandeville, Louisiana (d. 1939)

== May 29, 1900 (Tuesday) ==
- The word "escalator" was introduced into the English language, as the Patent and Trademark Office formally granted the trademark to Charles Seeberger for a moving stairway. However, Seeberger lost the trademark fifty years later when a patent commissioner ruled that the term had become generic, in Haughton Elevator Co. v. Seeberger, 85 U.S.P.Q. 80 (Comm'r Pat. 1950)
- William P. Dun Lany and Herbert R. Palmer were awarded a patent for their invention, described as "a certain new and useful improvement in Facsimile Telegraphs ... to simplify such telegraph instrument, to render them more accurate and efficient, more easily adjustable to meet the varying conditions presented, and adapt them to receive a message or picture by a direct impression or a hammer and anvil movement instead of by an electrochemical change in the receiving surface." They received U.S. Patent No. 650,381 for the device, which Palmer would demonstrate a year later at Columbia University.

== May 30, 1900 (Wednesday) ==
- Lord Roberts was met outside of Johannesburg by its Governor, Fritz Krause, for terms of surrender. "He begged me to defer entering the town for twenty-four hours, as there were many armed burghers still inside," General Roberts cabled. "I agreed to this, as I am most anxious to avert the possibility of anything like disturbance inside the town ..." At 10:00 the next morning, Lord Roberts and the British army entered the town, hauled down the South African flag from the courthouse, and raised the Union Jack in its place. The armies then began the march to the capital, Pretoria, which had been evacuated the day before.

== May 31, 1900 (Thursday) ==
- Western forces arrived in Beijing to protect their nations' citizens during the Boxer Rebellion. From the navies of the United States, the United Kingdom, Italy, Japan and Russia were a total of only 337 men in a nation of scores of millions. U.S. Marine Captain John T. Myers, leading the American Legation Guard of 56 men into the Chinese capital, noted later that "Our entry was not opposed, but the crowds were deadly silent."
- The governing body of the Free Church of Scotland voted 592 to 29, to unite with the United Presbyterian Church of Scotland (which had approved the merger earlier), creating the United Free Church of Scotland.
