= March 1900 =

Month in 1900

<<	March 1900					>>
Su	Mo	Tu	We	Th	Fr	Sa
				1	2	3
4	5	6	7	8	9	10
11	12	13	14	15	16	17
18	19	20	21	22	23	24
25	26	27	28	29	30	31

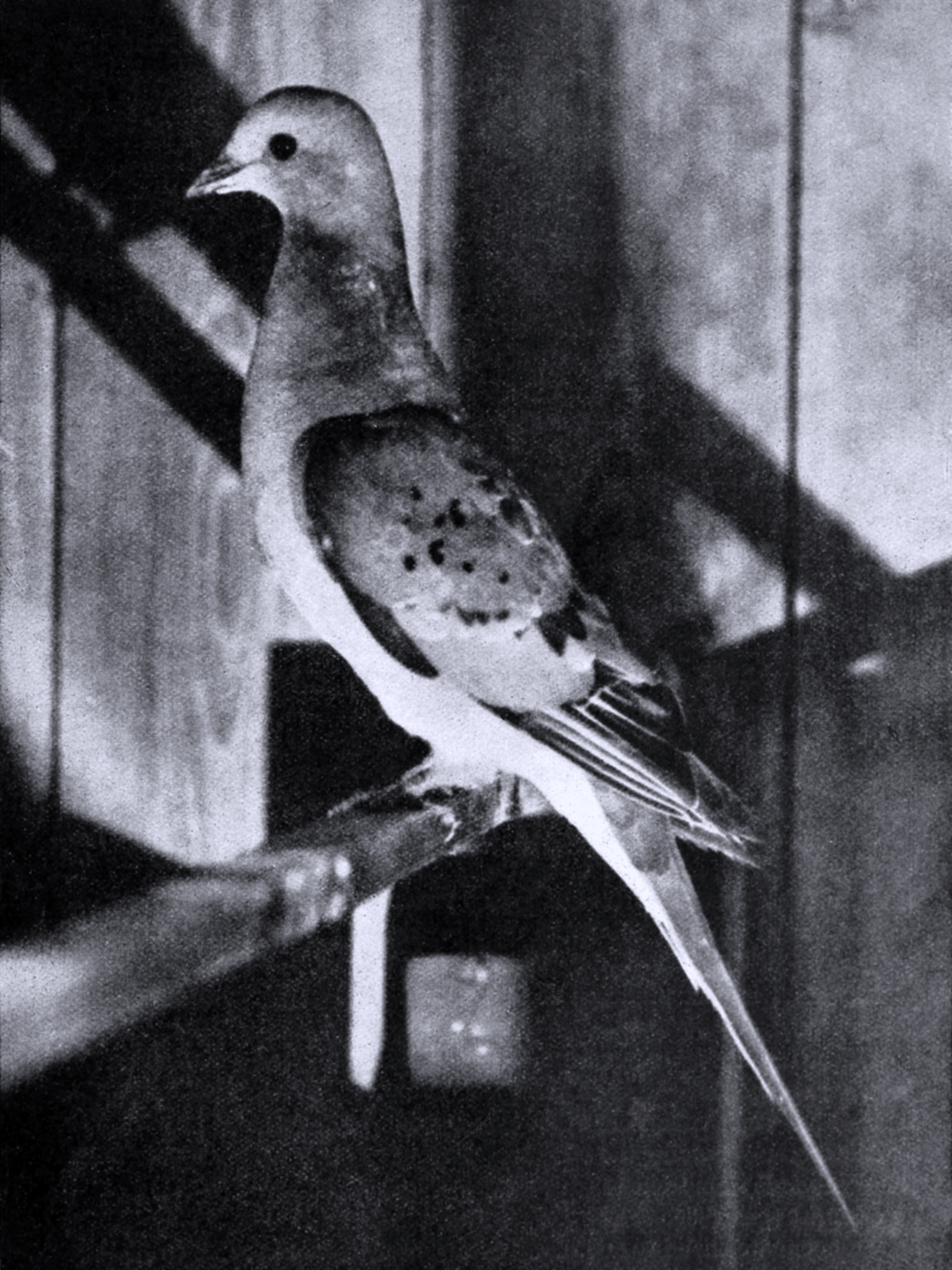
March 24, 1900: The last passenger pigeon in the wild is killed

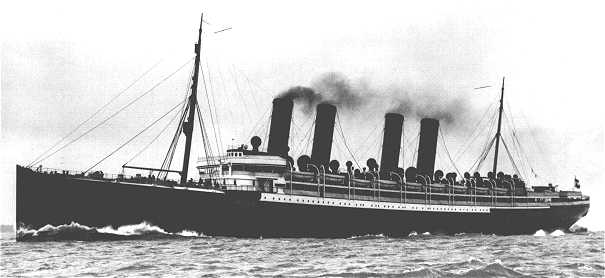
March 7, 1900: The Wilhelm der Grosse becomes the first ship to install wireless radio

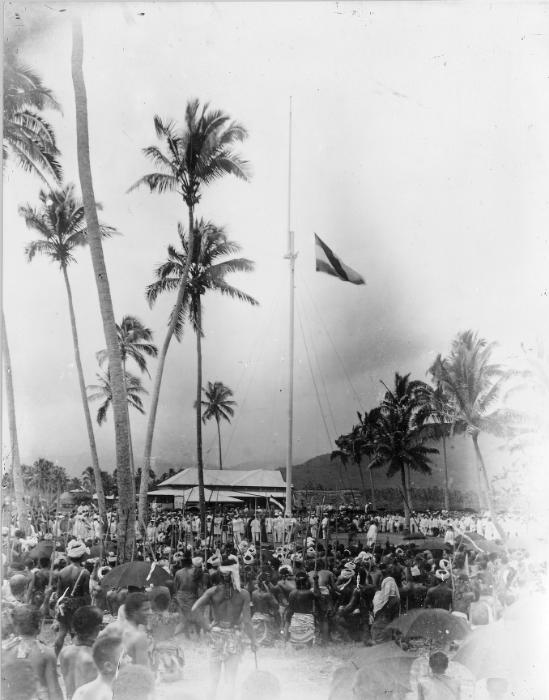
March 1, 1900: Samoa becomes a colony of Germany

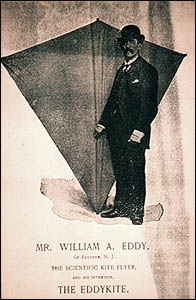
March 27, 1900: Standard kite patented by William Eddy

The following events occurred in March 1900:

== March 1, 1900 (Thursday) ==
- The German flag was formally hoisted at Apia, the capital of Samoa, and Wilhelm Solf became the colony's first governor. Chief Mata'afa, who had fought against the Germans, and Chief Tamasese, who had been the puppet ruler during German occupation, reconciled. Mata'afa was named as the paramount chief of the western Samoa colony, although Germany's Kaiser Wilhelm was designated as the Paramount King.
- The United Kingdom and its subjects celebrated across the world when the news arrived of the relief of the South African fortress Ladysmith. "London went literally mad with joy, and throughout England the scenes witnessed have no parallel in the memories of this generation."

== March 2, 1900 (Friday) ==
- The University of Kansas basketball team would win three NCAA championships (1952, 1988 and 2008), but suffered its worst loss of all time on this evening in Lincoln, Nebraska, falling to the University of Nebraska 48–8. "Coach Naismith, who is the originator of the game of basket ball, came up from Lawrence yesterday afternoon and brought a team that represents fine physical specimens of manhood", wrote a local paper, "but they were slow in following the ball. They complained of the slickness of the floor ..."
- The first high school basketball game in Illinois was played, at Elgin, Illinois. Englewood High School of Chicago defeated Elgin 16–12.
- Pope Leo, who would live to be the oldest pontiff in history, celebrated his 90th birthday.
- Mangi Meli, Mangi Ngalami and 17 other Chagga leaders and noblemen are hanged in Old Moshi, Kilimanjaro Region by the occupying German East Africa colonial government.
- U.S. Representative Sydney Parham Epes, 34, died at Garfield Hospital in Washington, D.C., following an appendectomy. The Virginia Democrat had been a Member of Congress for less than one year.
- Born:
  - Kurt Weill, German-American composer; in Dessau (d. 1950)
  - Morris K. Jessup, American writer, known for investigation and writings on UFOs; in Rockville, Indiana (d. 1959)

== March 3, 1900 (Saturday) ==
- In New York City, a drunken spectator twice approached the carriage carrying U.S. President William McKinley and Secretary George B. Cortelyou, attempting to open the vehicle's door in an attempt to shake hands with the President. NYPD Commissioner Michael C. Murphy would recall the incident after McKinley's assassination in Buffalo, New York 18 months later in 1901.
- In Cleveland, the owners of baseball's National League met with representatives of the newly organized American League to avert a crisis over player signings. In return for the National League dropping objections to AL franchises in Cleveland and Chicago, the former Western League would operate as a minor circuit for 1900, with its players subject to being called up by the Nationals. The AL's eight teams for the 1900 season would be the Buffalo Bisons, Chicago White Sox, Cleveland Blues, Detroit Tigers, Indianapolis Indians, Kansas City Blues, Milwaukee Brewers, and the Minneapolis Millers.
- James T. Cooley, the 89-year-old Sheriff of Chilton County, Alabama, was beaten to death by an insane jail prisoner who had killed a fellow prisoner the previous night.
- Born:
  - Edna Best, British stage and film actress, appeared on early television in 1938; in Hove, East Sussex (d. 1974)
  - Ruby Dandridge, African-American film and radio actress; in Wichita, Kansas (d. 1987)

== March 4, 1900 (Sunday) ==
- The first railway service in Nigeria was inaugurated with the opening of a line between Lagos and Ibadan. Built by the British colonial government, the railroad track extended for 122.5 miles (197.1 km) and cost 1,000,000 pounds.
- Born: Herbert Biberman, American screenwriter and film director, one of the Hollywood Ten blacklisted in the 1950s; in Philadelphia (d. 1971)

== March 5, 1900 (Monday) ==
- The Hall of Fame for Great Americans, the inspiration for many Halls of Fame in the years that followed, was founded with the help of a $250,000 donation by Helen Miller Shepard, to commemorate persons deemed by a committee of 100 to have made great contributions to the United States. In addition to still-famous individuals like George Washington, Abraham Lincoln and Benjamin Franklin, the first group of enshrinees included Supreme Court justice Joseph Story, Congressman Horace Mann, and botanist Asa Gray.
- Two U.S. Navy cruisers, the USS Detroit and the USS Marblehead, were sent to Central America to protect American interests in a dispute between Nicaragua and Costa Rica. The United States Department of War sent the ships at the request of the American envoy to Costa Rica.
- Wallack's Theatre in New York City was closed under decree by Chief William Stephen Devery of the New York City Police Department on grounds that its presentation of the play Sapho was "a public nuisance in that is an offense against public decency". Lead actress Olga Nethersole and producer Hamilton Revelle were both arrested as well. The same evening, David Belasco's production of Madame Butterfly opened at the Herald Square Theatre on Broadway. The play, not to be confused with Giacomo Puccini's 1904 opera, had been adapted from the story by John Luther Long.

== March 6, 1900 (Tuesday) ==
- Forty-six coal miners were killed at the Red Ash Mine at Fayette County, West Virginia. "The victims were not burned to death", noted an account, "but were killed by being hurled violently by the force of the explosion. Skulls were fractured and limbs broken – some in many places. So great was this force that the air driven out of the mine piled the coal cars in heaps in front of its entrance."
- The United States Senate voted 44 to 28 to pass the Gold Standard Act.
- An excavated Roman amphitheatre at Saint-André-sur-Cailly, France, was formally presented to the city.
- Died:
  - Gottlieb Daimler, 75, founder in 1883 of the Daimler Motoren Gesellschaft (b. 1834). The automobile that he created was named for Mercédès Jellinek, the daughter of Daimler's French agent and was marketed as the Mercedes-Benz.
  - Alfred C. Harmer, American politician, 74, U.S. Representative for Pennsylvania (b. 1825). He was nicknamed the "Father of the House" because of his long (three decades) service.

== March 7, 1900 (Wednesday) ==
- A new era in transportation safety began on reports of the first successful transmission of Wireless signals from a passenger ship to a distant receiver. The German steamer SS Kaiser Wilhelm der Grosse, carrying 1,500 passengers, transmitted from on ship to Borkum, fifty miles away in Germany.
- The Montreal Shamrocks, holders of the Stanley Cup since 1899, retained the trophy after beating the Halifax Crescents 11–0 in the second game of a best of three series.
- The first withdrawal of American troops from the Philippines was ordered by the U.S. president to General Elwell Stephen Otis.

== March 8, 1900 (Thursday) ==
- Gaston A. Robbins had defeated William F. Aldrich in the 1898 election for U.S. Representative for the Alabama's 4th congressional district, and had served in United States Congress since March 4, 1899. After an election contest determined that Aldrich had won the election, Robbins was removed from office. Aldrich was sworn in on March 13.
- Londoners celebrated as Queen Victoria made a rare visit to the city in celebration of the British victory at Ladysmith.

== March 9, 1900 (Friday) ==
- In Indianapolis, the Social Democratic Party of America nominated Eugene V. Debs for president and Job Harriman for Vice President . Debs, in his first run for the presidency, would pick up 0.6% of the popular vote in the November presidential election, and run four more times after that (1904, 1908, 1912 and 1920).
- Born: Howard H. Aiken, American physicist and computing pioneer, primary designer of the first Mark computer; in Hoboken, New Jersey (d. 1973)

== March 10, 1900 (Saturday) ==
- In Springfield, Illinois, the remains of Abraham Lincoln and his family were removed so that renovations could be made of his tomb. Held in a vault for more than a year, the remains were returned to the tomb, without public ceremony, on April 24, 1901.
- After escaping from Frankfort, Kentucky, Secretary of State Caleb Powers was arrested in Lexington, Kentucky, for conspiracy in the murder of Governor William Goebel. Powers and State Guard Captain Davis had put on uniforms and escaped on a train. Powers served eight years in prison, but was pardoned in 1908 and later served as a U.S. representative from 1911 to 1919.
- Born: Erich Kästner, last surviving German veteran of World War I; in Schönefeld, (d. 2008)

== March 11, 1900 (Sunday) ==
- Captain Umberto Cagni of Italy, with ten men and 102 dogs, set off from the base camp at Franz Josef Land, established by the Arctic expedition of the Duke of Abruzzi. Cagni's men did not reach the North Pole, but planted the Italian flag at 86–34 N on April 25, closer than anyone had before, before turning back.
- Religious broadcasting was launched in Elkhart, Indiana, as the Reverend E.H. Gwynne of the First Presbyterian Church, began preaching his sermons by telephone technology. A transmitter, designed by inventors from the Home Telephone Company for the benefit of a crippled parishioner, was placed on the pulpit, "and every word was as distinctly heard as though the listeners were present in the church", a reporter noted.
- At the Mount Olivet Baptist Church at 53rd Street near Broadway in New York City, Pastor C.T. Walker baptized 184 African Americans at the end of revival services. Nicknamed "the Colored John the Baptist", Walker was originally from Augusta, Georgia, where a school bears his name.

== March 12, 1900 (Monday) ==
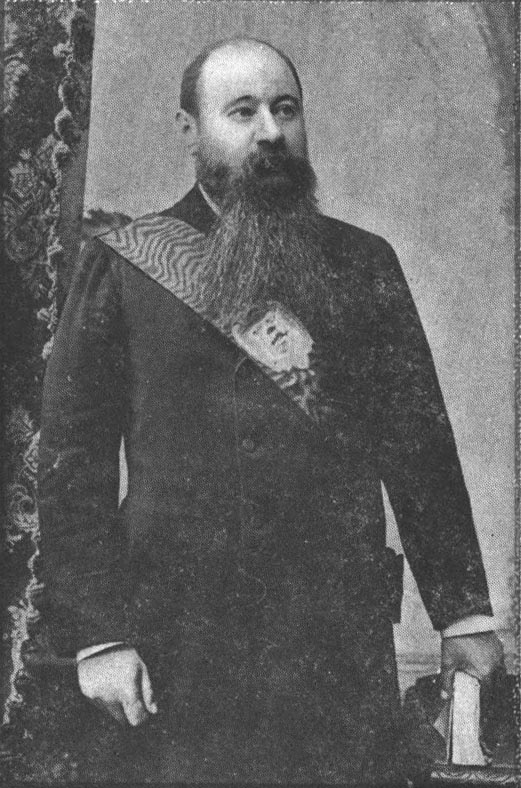
Steyn

The Orange Free State flag

- At 5:00 p.m., General John French gave the leaders of the Orange Free State (the Oranje-Vrystaat) 11 hours to surrender. French had arrived within five miles of the capital, Bloemfontein. President Martinus Theunis Steyn fled the capital ahead of the invasion force. The city leaders capitulated the next morning, bringing an end to the republic as an independent nation.
- William Albin Young, U.S. Representative for Virginia's 2nd congressional district since March 4, 1899, was removed from office following a contest of the 1898 election, by a vote of 132–128. Richard Alsop Wise, Young's opponent in the elections of 1896 and 1898, was seated on April 26. Wise died on December 21, 1900.

== March 13, 1900 (Tuesday) ==
- The United States House of Representatives voted 166–120 in favor of passage of the Gold Standard Act, also known as the Overstreet Act, and the measure was sent to U.S. President William McKinley for his signature
- At 10:00 am, British forces marched into Bloemfontein, the capital of the Orange Free State, and took possession. Led by the Royal Engineers corps, C. E. Shaw captured the Orange Free State flag atop the capital building replacing it with a white flag. Mayor Kellner and other officials, reported Lord Roberts, "met me two miles from the town and presented me with the keys to the public offices." When Roberts and his soldiers entered the city at noon, he was cheered by the conquered Boers.
- Born: Queen Salote, Tongan noble, Queen of Tonga from 1918 to 1965 (d. 1965)

== March 14, 1900 (Wednesday) ==
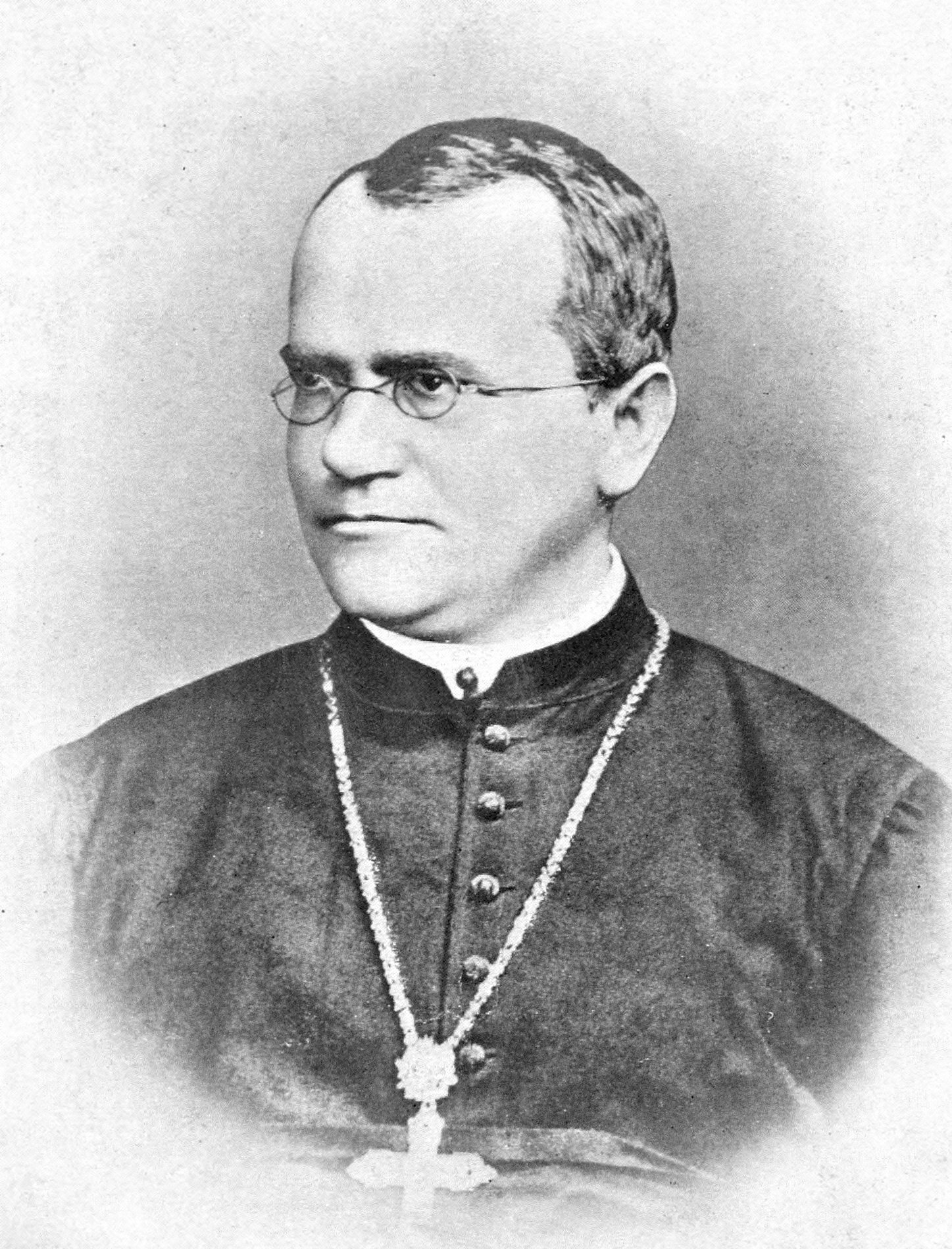
Mendel

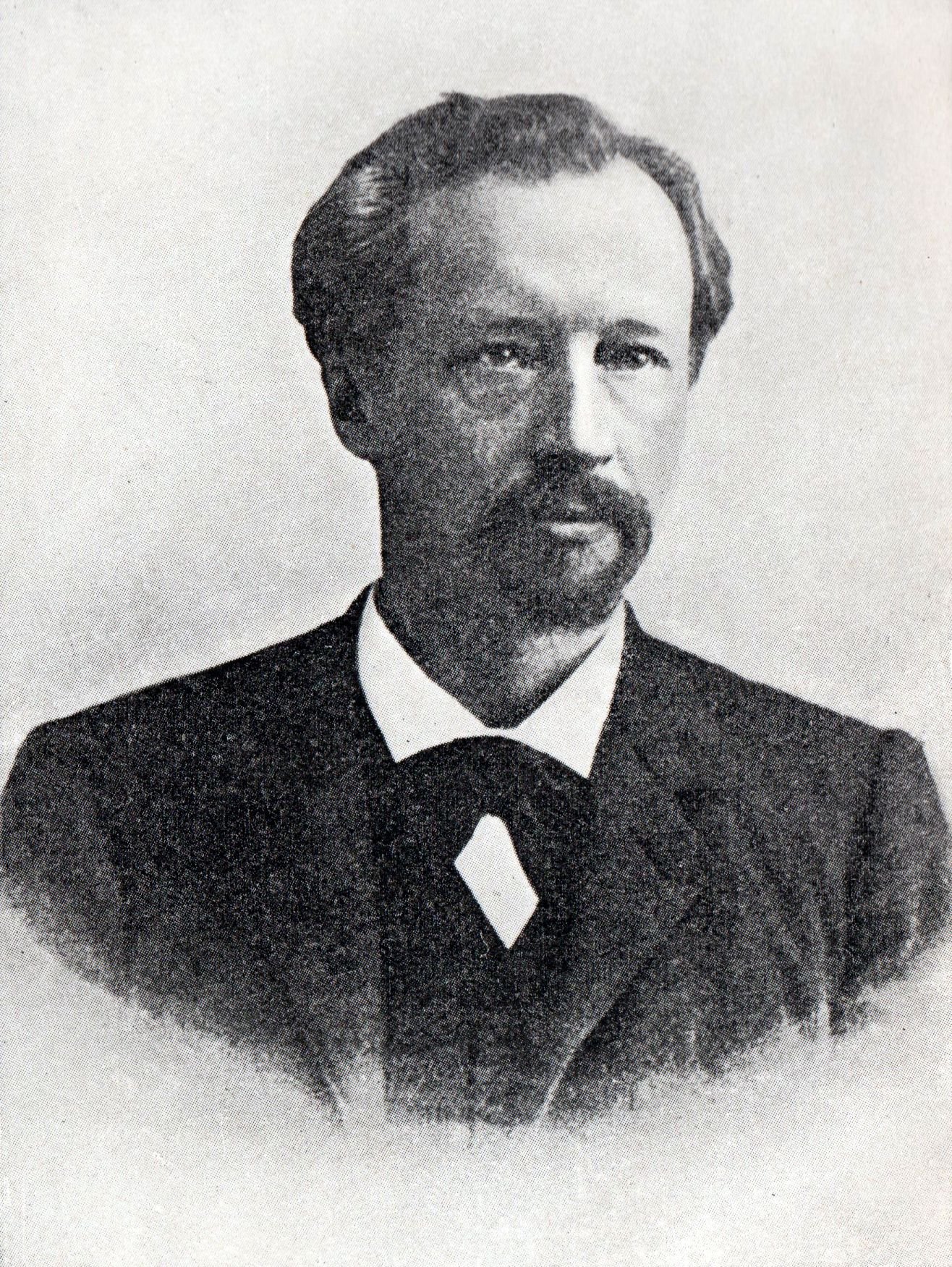
de Vries

- At 1:14 in the afternoon at the White House, U.S. President William McKinley signed the Gold Standard Act into law using a gold pen presented to him by U.S. Representative Jesse Overstreet of Indiana, who had sponsored the legislation.
- Botanist Hugo de Vries submitted a paper to the German journal Comptes Rendus, outlining a rediscovery of Mendel's laws of heredity. Both de Vries and German botanist Carl Correns had been working independently of each other in 1900 and found Gregor Mendel's 1865 paper on genetics. Correns' paper was completed on April 22. Wrote De Vries, "I draw the conclusion that the law of segregation of hybrids as discovered by Mendel for peas finds very general application in the plant kingdom ... This memoir, very beautiful for its time, has been misunderstood and forgotten."

== March 15, 1900 (Thursday) ==
- In Louisburg and Morrisville, North Carolina, an unusual weather phenomenon appeared in the form of black rain that fell from an intensely dark cloud. Professor M.S. Davis of Louisburg College collected a sample of the black rainwater and had it analyzed by chemists at the University of North Carolina. Drs. Baskerville and Weller concluded, in an article in Science magazine, that the rain had a high, and unexplained, concentration of soot. Elsewhere in the nation, 6 1/2 inches of snow fell in New York City; 8 inches in Washington, D.C., and snow fell in the Deep South in Mississippi, Louisiana, Alabama, and north Texas.
- The Standard Oil Company paid the largest dividend ever distributed up to that time, disbursing to shareholders a total of twenty million dollars ($20,000,000) in cash based on $20 a share. The dividend had been declared on February 6, and broke a record of a stock dividend paid by the Pullman car company.

== March 16, 1900 (Friday) ==
- The company that would become known as AMF Bowling was incorporated in New Jersey as the American Machine and Foundry Company.
- In response to growing trouble with Boxer rebels in China, United States Secretary of the Navy John Davis Long cabled instructions to the naval base at Cavite, in the Philippines, to ready a warship to sail to Taku in China to protect missionaries at Tianjin. The gunboat Nashville would be sent on June 9.
- The city of Cortland, New York, was founded.

== March 17, 1900 (Saturday) ==
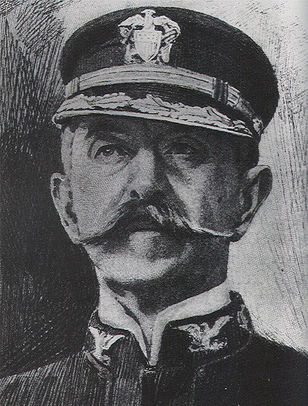
Leary

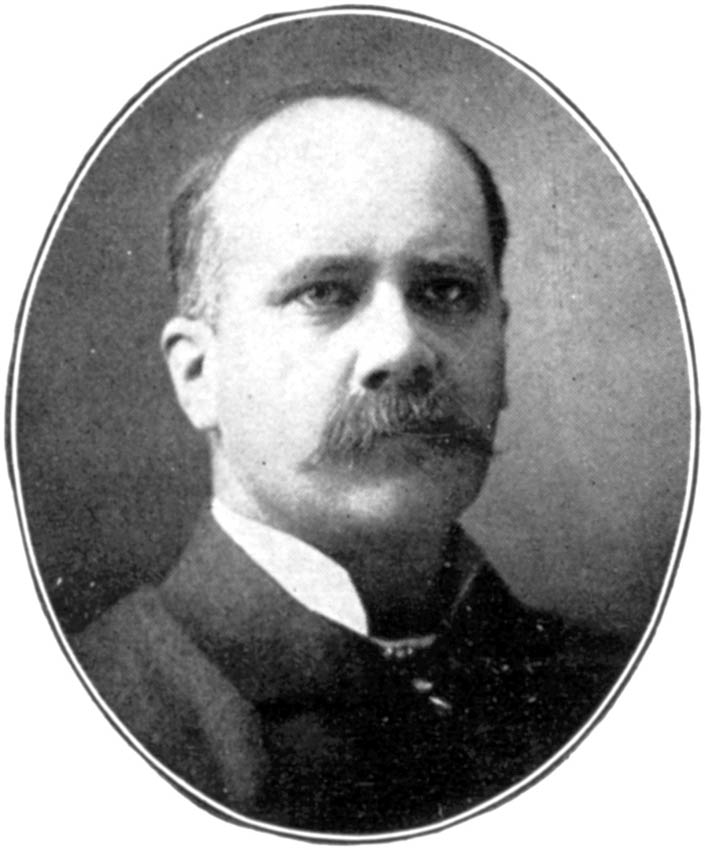
Sheldon

- Richard P. Leary, the American Governor of Guam, issued a proclamation abolishing slavery on the island.
- American forces, led by Major Henry Hale of the 44th Infantry Battalion, arrived at Tagbilaran and took control of Bohol in the Philippines. The Boholanos resisted American occupation for years thereafter.
- The Topeka Daily Capital published its final "Sheldon Edition", bringing to a close an experiment that had started on March 13. The publisher of the Capital had challenged author Charles Sheldon to try editing a daily newspaper as Jesus might. Sheldon, the author of In His Steps (and the originator of the question "What would Jesus do?"), edited the paper for five days, emphasizing "good news" stories. During the experiment, the circulation of the Capital increased from about 12,000 to more than 350,000 (with the help of presses in Chicago and New York City). Rather than closing with a Sunday paper, Sheldon published a "Saturday Evening Edition" following the regular morning paper, with instructions that even the news carriers were "to deliver their papers in time to reach home themselves before Sunday", and there was "no news of the world". Sheldon wrote, "The human race can be just as happy and useful and powerful if it does not know every twenty-four hours the news of the wars and the sports and the society events of the world."
- Born: Alfred Newman, American composer, recipient of nine Academy Awards in a career of creating musical scores for films; in New Haven, Connecticut (d. 1970)

== March 18, 1900 (Sunday) ==
- Comedian W. C. Fields, recently signed by the William Morris Agency, broke into big time show business when he opened for the Orpheum vaudeville circuit in San Francisco. Fields, age 20, was billed as "The Tramp Juggler", and was touring Europe by the end of the year.
- Maud S., a race horse beloved by millions of Americans and known as "The Race Track Queen", died a week short of turning 26 years old. Owned by wealthy philanthropist Robert E. Bonner, whom she outlived by almost a year, she had set a record on July 30, 1885, for running a mile in two minutes, 8.75 seconds.

== March 19, 1900 (Monday) ==
- Harry Lauder, celebrated as Scotland's greatest entertainer, made his professional debut at Gatti's Music Hall in London. A former coal miner who entertained his co-workers in the mines, Lauder was encouraged to try out at local talent competition, where he was discovered and signed to a contract. At one time, Lauder was the highest-paid entertainer in the world.
- The city of Glendora, Mississippi, was founded.
- Born: Frédéric Joliot-Curie, French physicist, recipient in 1935 of the Nobel Prize in Chemistry; in Paris (d. 1958)

== March 20, 1900 (Tuesday) ==
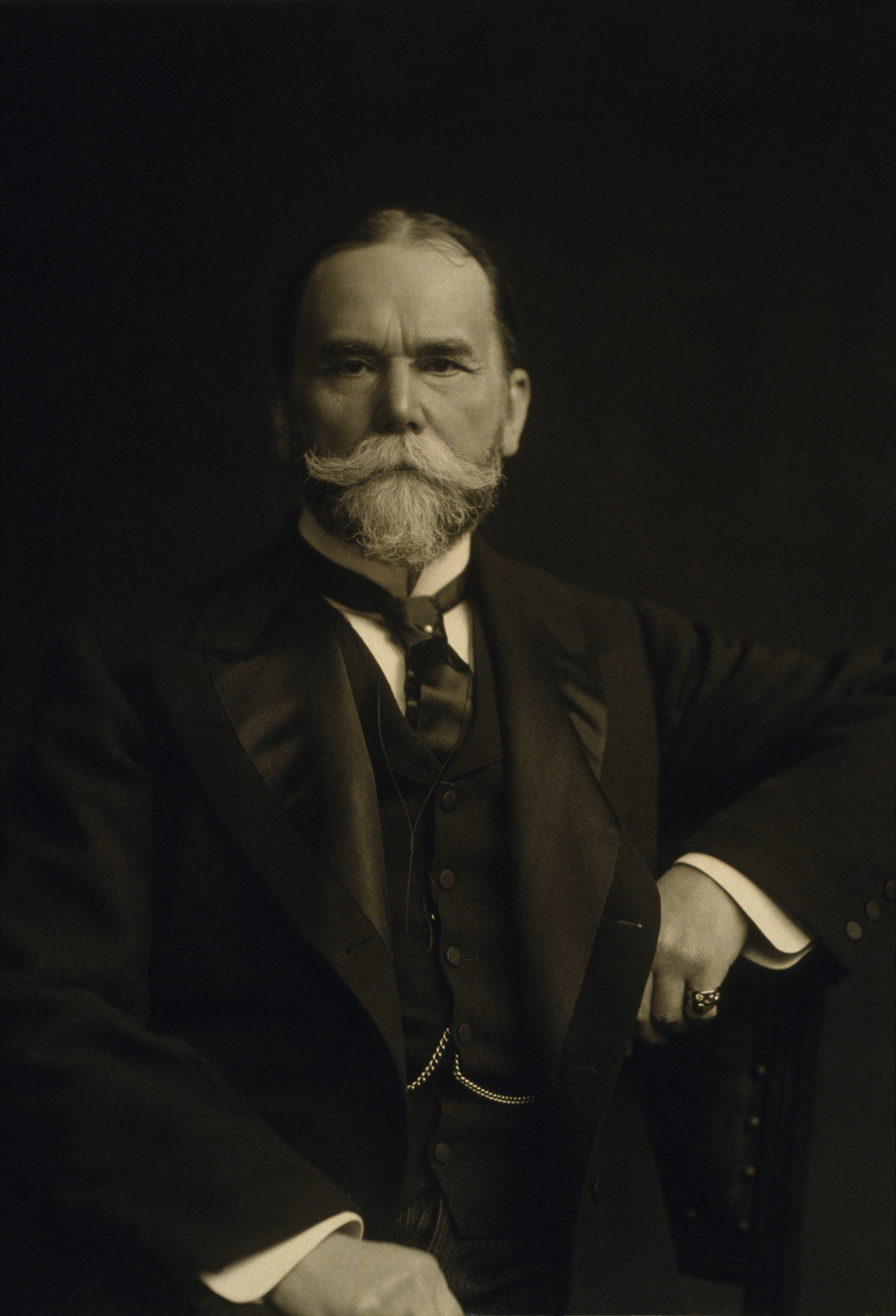
Secretary Hay

- Nikola Tesla received patent No. 645,576 for wireless transmission of electric power, the first in a series of patents for sending "industrially significant amounts of power" from one station to another without electrical wires. Tesla's U.S. patent 685,012 "Means for Increasing the Intensity of Electrical Oscillations" was granted the next day.
- In Washington, D.C., United States Secretary of State John Hay informed the ambassadors from six of the world's major powers (the United Kingdom, France, Germany, Russia, Italy and Japan) that he considered them to have accepted his proposal for an Open Door Policy and non-interference in China. His instructions to each government were that the United States regarded the answers as "definitive and binding".
- The borough of Metuchen, New Jersey, was incorporated.
- Thomas Lambert received a U.S. patent (No.645,920) for molding cylinder records in celluloid. They were marketed as Lambert records and were usually pressed in pink (usually for earlier releases), and black "ebony" (usually later releases)

== March 21, 1900 (Wednesday) ==
- George C. Hale, Chief of the Kansas City Fire Department and inventor of the Hale tower and the automatic harness, demonstrated the first heat sensitive automatic fire alarm system. The New York Times reported, "When the temperature goes above the maximum fixed for the building, an electric circuit is opened that puts into operation a phonograph which talks into a telephone, telling Fire Headquarters that there is a fire at whatever address the alarm is located."

== March 22, 1900 (Thursday) ==
- Anne Rainsford French was awarded a Steam Engineer's License (Locomobile Class), issued by the City of Washington, D.C., making her one of the first, if not the first, women to receive a driver's license. However, Mrs. John Howell Phillips received a license, in Chicago, in late 1899.

== March 23, 1900 (Friday) ==
- Dr. Karl Landsteiner's first report on his discovery of a process for classification of the four blood groups under the ABO blood group system (as A, B, AB and O), "Zur Kenntnis der antifermentativen, lytischen und agglutinierenden Wirkungen des Blutserums und der Lymphe" ("Regarding on the knowledge of the antifermentative, lytic and agglutinating effects of the blood serum and the lymph") was published in the Austrian medical journal Centralblatt fur Bakteriologie, Parasitenkunde und Infektionskrankheiten. In 1930, Landsteiner would win the Nobel Prize in Physiology or Medicine for his contribution to the discovery that made safe blood transfusions possible.
- At 11:00 in the morning, Arthur Evans began excavation of the site of the Minoan temple at Knossos, Crete.
- Born: Erich Fromm, German-American psychologist and philosopher; in Frankfurt (d. 1980)

== March 24, 1900 (Saturday) ==
- New York Mayor Robert Anderson Van Wyck broke ground for the underground "rapid transit tunnel" that would become the first part of the New York City Subway, linking Manhattan and Brooklyn. Using a silver spade, Van Wyck started in front of City Hall. "Tunnel day, for as such it will be known", wrote The New York Times, "was a greater day to the people, for it marked a beginning of a system of tunnels in future years and for future generations ..."
- Fifteen members of the New York City Fire Department fell into a basement full of 10 feet (3.0 m) of water. Captain John J. Grady and Firefighters Peter F. Bowen and William J. Smith drowned.
- The first workplace smoking ban was issued by Willis L. Moore, Chief of the U.S. Weather Bureau, the forerunner of the National Weather Service, for all of its offices. The Director's Instruction No. 51 declared that "The smoking of cigarettes in the offices of the Weather Bureau is hereby prohibited. Officials in charge of stations will rigidly enforce this order, and will also include in their semiannual confidential reports information as to those of their assistants who smoke cigarettes outside of office hours."
- U.S. President William McKinley signed the Puerto Rican appropriation bill of $2,095,455.88 after it passed the House 135–87.

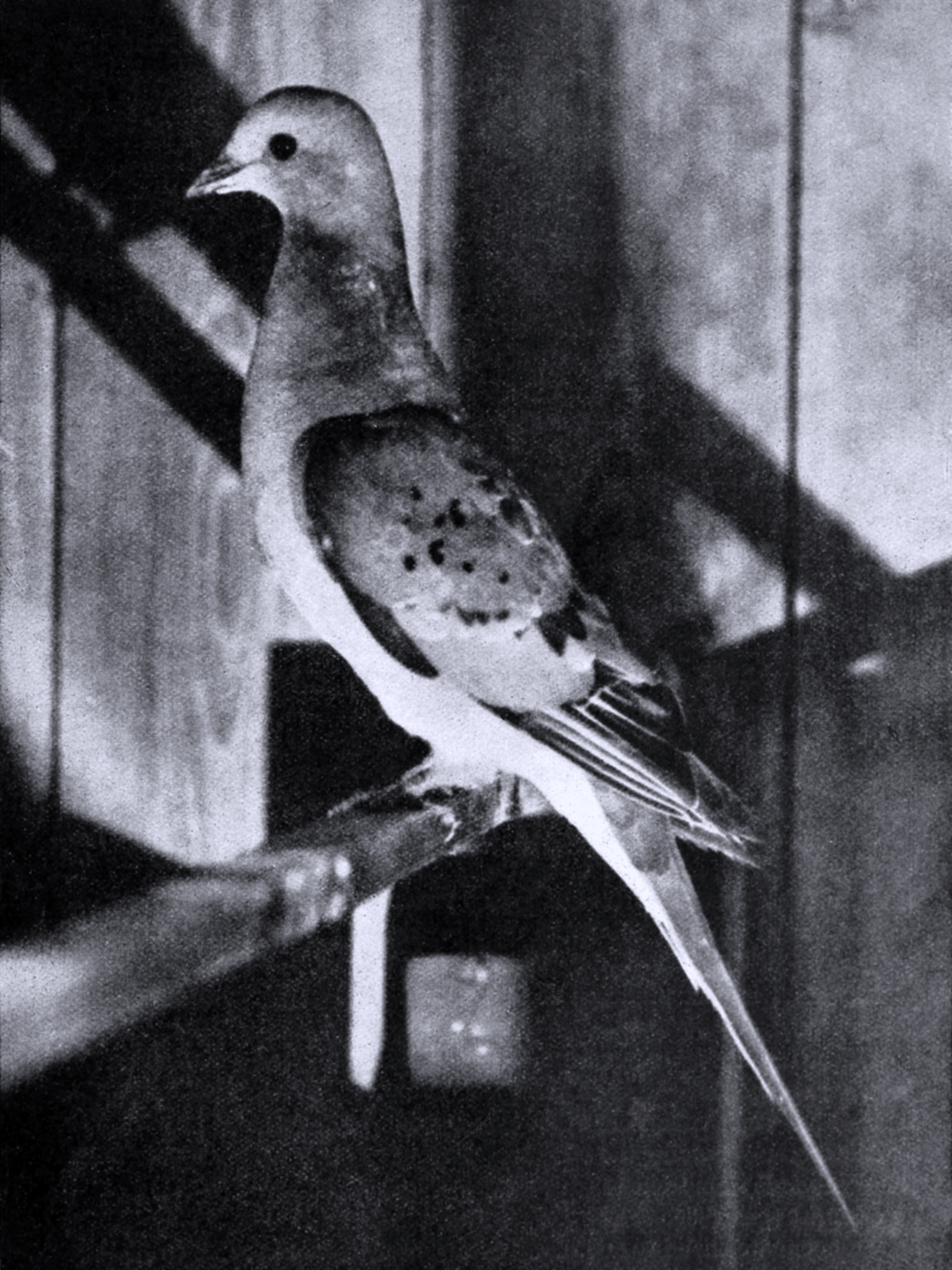
A passenger pigeon

- Press Clay Southworth, 14, shot the last passenger pigeon in the wild, near his farm in Sargents, Ohio. The species would become extinct when the last living passenger pigeon died on September 1, 1914, in the Cincinnati Zoo.

== March 25, 1900 (Sunday) ==
- The Socialist Party was founded in the United States by a committee meeting in New York City from members of the Social Democratic and Socialist Labor parties.

== March 26, 1900 (Monday) ==
- On the Greek site of Knossos, the excavations directed by archaeologist Arthur Evans found the first figurines of people that dated back to the Neolithic era in Greece, small statues from the Minoan civilization from more than 5,000 years earlier.
- The "stamp book" was introduced to American customers after Third Assistant Postmaster General Edwin C. Madden had, "after considerable experiment", devised a convenient way for buying large quantities of stamps for later use, with several perforated sheets of six stamps each between paper covers. Similar stamp books had been introduced in Luxembourg in 1895 and Sweden in 1898.

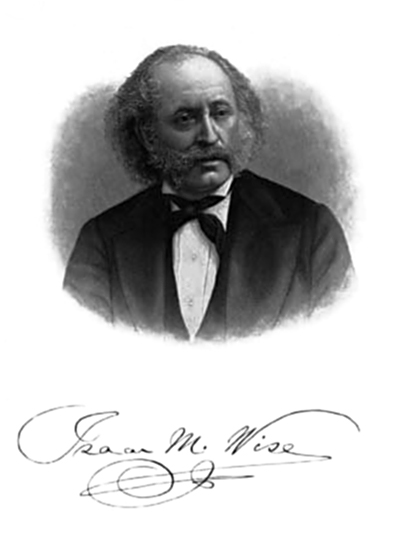
Rabbi Wise

- Died: Isaac Mayer Wise, known as "The Father of American Judaism" and "The Moses of America", 81. Two days earlier, Dr. Wise had collapsed while delivering a lecture at the Hebrew Union College in Cincinnati. (b. 1819)

== March 27, 1900 (Tuesday) ==
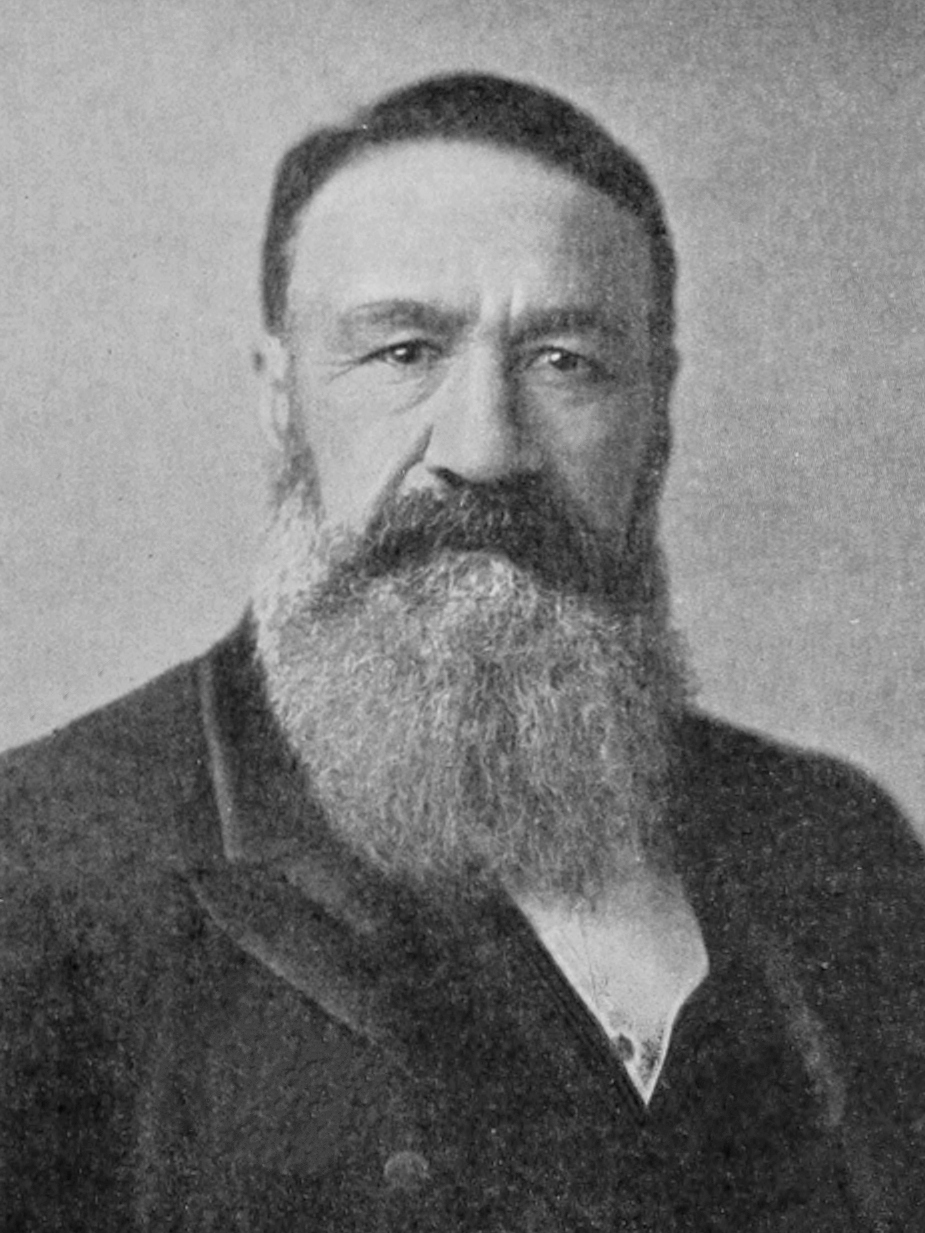
General Joubert

- As British forces prepared to advance on Pretoria, South Africa's greatest general, Piet Joubert, died of peritonitis at the age of 68.
- Queen Victoria received delegates at Windsor Castle from the British colonies in Australia to discuss the Australian Commonwealth Bill in preparation for federation and an independent state and voiced her disagreement with the word "commonwealth". "She found the title obnoxious to her", wrote one author, "She had an ingrained dislike for the word 'Commonwealth,' which she identified with Oliver Cromwell and his Republican form of government." The Queen's suggestion was that the new nation be called the "Dominion of Australia", similar to the title of the Canadian state. The assembled delegates persuaded the Queen that the word "commonwealth" had other meanings beyond those associated with Oliver Cromwell, and she reluctantly dropped further objections, giving her full support for Australian independence.

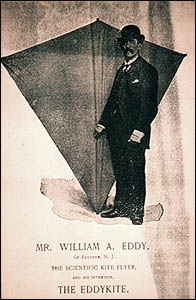
William Eddy with his kite

- United States Patent No. 646,375 was granted to William Abner Eddy for the "Eddy kite", the diamond shaped, two-stick kite that became the standard for kite flying. Eddy, of Bayonne, New Jersey, had applied for the patent on August 1, 1898.
- United States Secretary of War Elihu Root announced the creation of the Division of the Pacific to administer the Philippines, with sub-departments for Northern Luzon, Southern Luzon, Visayas, Mindanao and Jolo.

== March 28, 1900 (Wednesday) ==
- The War of the Golden Stool was triggered in the British Gold Coast colony (modern-day Ghana) after Colonial Governor Frederick Mitchell Hodgson offended a gathering of the chiefs of the Ashanti Empire. In Kumasi, Governor Hodgson demanded the Golden Stool, the most sacred relic of the Asante nation. After summoning the chiefs, Governor Hodgson refused to sit at the chair provided and demanded "Why did you not take the opportunity of my coming to Kumasi to bring the Golden Stool and give it to me to sit upon?" War broke out and Hodgson and his party barely escaped with their lives.
- In Calcutta, the Viceroy of India, Lord Curzon addressed the British governing council and announced that nearly 5,000,000 victims of famine were now receiving relief. Curzon stated that the cost was 525 "lacs of rupees". The value of 52,500,000 rupees was equivalent to £3,500,000 at the time.

== March 29, 1900 (Thursday) ==
- In Bern, Switzerland, an arbitration tribunal resolved claims arising from the Delagoa Bay Railroad. Portugal was ordered to pay to the United Kingdom and the United States 15,314,000 francs and 5% interest from June 25, 1889, roughly $5,000,000. The railroad, built to link Lourenço Marques in Portuguese East Africa (now Mozambique) to Pretoria, South Africa, had been started by British and American construction companies, but was seized by the Portuguese government. The British and American governments then filed claims for damages.
- Born: John McEwen, Prime Minister of Australia, for one month in 1968; in Chiltern, Australia (d. 1980)

== March 30, 1900 (Friday) ==
- Legislation took effect in France, reducing the workday for women and children from 12 hours to 11 hours. The law provided further that on April 1, 1902, the workday would go to 10 1/2 hours and to ten hours by April 1, 1904.
- Died: Father Leonardo Murialdo, 71, founder of the Congregation of Saint Joseph (b. 1828). He would be canonized by Pope Paul VI on May 3, 1970.

== March 31, 1900 (Saturday) ==
- The first clay tablets with Linear B writing was discovered at the excavation of the Minoan ruins at Knossos. The language was finally deciphered in 1951.
- At Sanna's Post, Boer General Christiaan de Wet led a surprise counterattack on British forces under the command of Brigadier General Robert Broadwood, inflicting more than 150 casualties and obtaining the surrender of more than 400 of the British forces. The water supply for Bloemfontein, the Orange Free State capital that had been recently captured by the British, was cut off, causing the spread of typhoid fever within the capital.
- Born: Prince Henry, son of King George V and third in line of succession for the British throne from 1911 to 1926; in Sandringham, Norfolk (d. 1974)
