= Charles Seeberger =

American inventor

Charles David Seeberger
- Born: May 14, 1857; Oskaloosa, Iowa, U.S.
- Died: September 13, 1931 (aged 74); Oak Bluffs Highlands, Massachusetts, U.S.
- Occupation(s): Inventor, innovator
- Spouse: Emma V. Seeberger (1880–1931)
- Children: R. Vernon; Lucia
- Parent(s): Anthony Seeberger; Jennie Cooper

Charles D. Seeberger (May 14, 1857 – September 13, 1931) was an American inventor. In 1899, he joined the Otis Elevator Company. The Seeberger-Otis partnership produced the first step-type escalator made for public use, and it was installed at the Paris Exhibition of 1900, where it won first prize. Mr. Seeberger eventually sold his patent rights to Otis in 1910.
