= Digital Network Intelligence =

Digital Network Intelligence or DNI is a term used in the United States Intelligence Community that refers to "intelligence from intercepted digital data communications transmitted between, or resident on, networked computers."

== Programs and units gathering DNI ==
- Pinwale, an NSA collection and retrieval system for DNI, including internet e-mail
- STORMBREW, a secret NSA internet surveillance program
- 659th Intelligence, Surveillance and Reconnaissance Group of the United States Air Force, an intelligence unit located at Fort George G. Meade, Maryland
- BLARNEY, an NSA communications surveillance program started in 1978
- PRISM, an NSA program, part of the PRISM program, for collecting internet communications from various U.S. internet companies
- OAKSTAR, an upstream collection program of the NSA for secret internet surveillance
- Fairview, a secret NSA program in cooperation with American telecommunications company AT&T
- XKeyscore, a secret NSA computer system for searching and analyzing global Internet data

== See also ==
- signals intelligence (SIGINT)
