= UTT =

UTT could refer to:

== People ==
- Utt (surname)
- Utt Panichkul, Thai–American actor, host and model

== Others ==
- K. D. Matanzima Airport, Umtata, South Africa, IATA code
- Ultimate Table Tennis, professional Indian table tennis league
- Unconscious Thought Theory
- Unified Targeting Tool, a database query tool used by NSA
- United Talmud Torahs of Montreal
- University of Technology of Troyes, France
- University of Texas at Tyler
- University of Trinidad and Tobago
- Untritrium, hypothetical chemical element 133
- Uttoxeter railway station, England, National Rail station code
