= Blarney (code name) =

US NSA communications surveillance program

BLARNEY is a communications surveillance program of the National Security Agency (NSA) of the United States. It started in 1978, operated under the Foreign Intelligence Surveillance Act and was expanded after the September 11 attacks.

The collection takes place at top-level telecommunications facilities within the United States, choke points through which most traffic will flow, including wireless. This type of surveillance is referred to as Upstream collection.

BLARNEY was first brought to public view in a PRISM slide revealed by Edward Snowden. The FY 2013 budget for BLARNEY was $65.96 million.

== Misrepresentations ==
Initially it was assumed that BLARNEY was the program under which the NSA cooperated with AT&T and that among the tapping facilities were AT&T's Room 641A in San Francisco, California, revealed in 2006 by Mark Klein, and another in New Jersey. However, new NSA documents released on August 15, 2015 show that the cooperation with AT&T takes places under FAIRVIEW, and that Room 641A is probably part of that program, instead of BLARNEY.

The new documents about FAIRVIEW also show that this isn't a larger umbrella program comprising BLARNEY, OAKSTAR, STORMBREW and others, as was said by Thomas Drake. Those programs are very similar, but associated with different companies, and may have slightly different legal arrangements with the NSA. Arrangements with corporations are associated with the NSA's Special Source Operations division (SSO).

== Legal authorities ==
BLARNEY operates under three legal authorities: NSA FISA, FBI FISA and section 702 FAA. Collection of data under the FISA authority requires a court order from the FISA Court (FISC) in which the identifiers ("selectors") for the target are mentioned. The legal process to acquire a court order can be expedited and approved within 2 days. BLARNEY collection under the FISA authority is the main contributor to the President's Daily Brief and accounts for over 11,000 product reports a year.

== Workings ==
To gather intelligence, algorithms are used to sift through the communications, and forward on, for storage and possible analysis, those which are believed likely to contain foreign intelligence. The first stage of filtering is done by the telecoms themselves, at the request of the NSA. The filters are not always perfect, and sometimes purely domestic communications are caught.

In the event that domestic communications are swept up, the minimization procedures are applied. The procedures require that most "incidental" communications between U.S. persons be destroyed, with a few exceptions. The exceptions include: the content is encrypted, it contains foreign intelligence, or is evidence of a crime. This last exception allows the NSA to pass to the Drug Enforcement Administration's Special Operations Division (SOD) information relating to drug trafficking. The program has been likened to Project SHAMROCK, in which the NSA, and its predecessor organization were given daily microfilm copies of all telegrams entering and exiting the United States.

== SIGADs ==
BLARNEY is known to be associated with two SIGADs of the same name. The designation for PRISM (US-984XN) is very similar to the designations of the BLARNEY SIGADs: US-984 and US-984X. Accordingly, the speaker's notes of an NSA presentation that was released on August 15, 2015, say that "PRISM falls under BLARNEY, but is just one access of many".

Designation	Covername	Legal Authority^{See Note}	Key Targets	Type of Information collected	Remarks
US-984 (PDDG:AX)	BLARNEY	FISA	Counter Proliferation; Counter Terrorism; Diplomatic; Economic; Military; Foreign Government (i.e. Political/Intentions of Nations)	DNI Strong Selectors; DNR Strong Selectors; DNI Circuits; DNR Circuits; Mobile Wireless; FISA Court authorized communications	Known facilities: AT&T's Room 641A in San Francisco, California; AT&T site in New Jersey
US-984X	BLARNEY	FAA	Counter Proliferation; Counter Terrorism; Diplomatic; Economic; Military; Foreign Government (i.e. Political/Intentions of Nations)	DNI Strong Selectors; DNR Strong Selectors; DNI Circuits; DNR Circuits; Mobile Wireless; FISA Court authorized communications	Known facilities: AT&T's Room 641A in San Francisco, California; AT&T site in New Jersey

Note: SIGADs not otherwise designated are presumed to operate under the legal authority of Section 702 of the FISA Amendments Act (FAA)

Glossary

- DNI: Digital Network Intelligence.
- DNR: Dial Number Recognition.
- Transit authority: A legal authority that states communications that transit the United States are collectible, provided that both endpoints are foreign.

== Media relating to BLARNEY ==
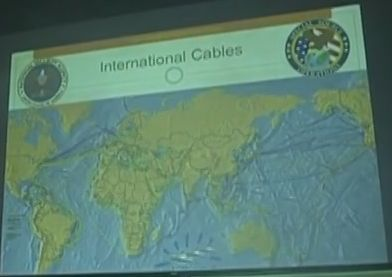
Upstream: Map of International Cables

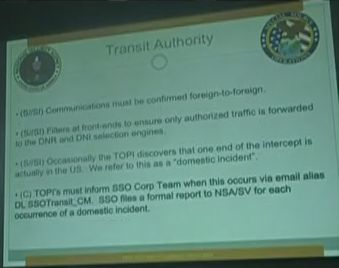
Upstream: Transit Authority

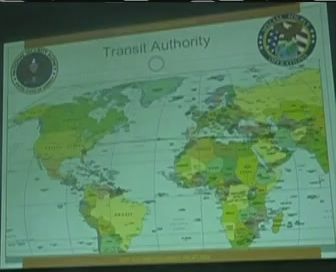
Upstream: Map of Transit Authority

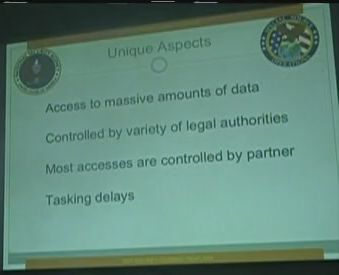
Upstream: Unique Aspects

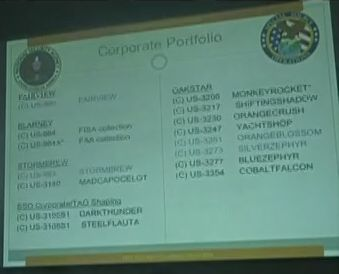
Upstream: Corporate Portfolio

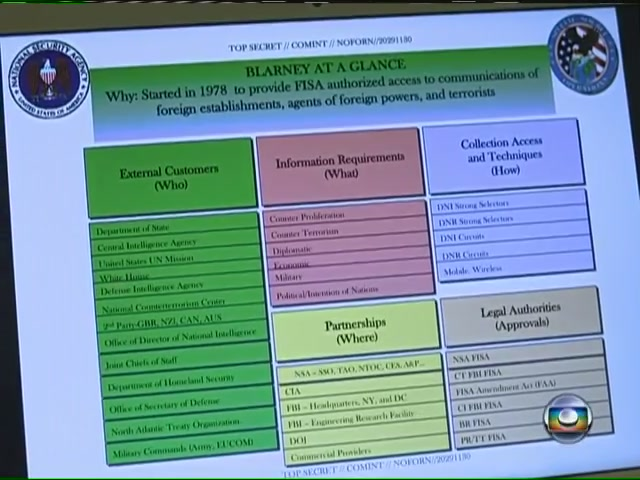
Blarney at a Glance

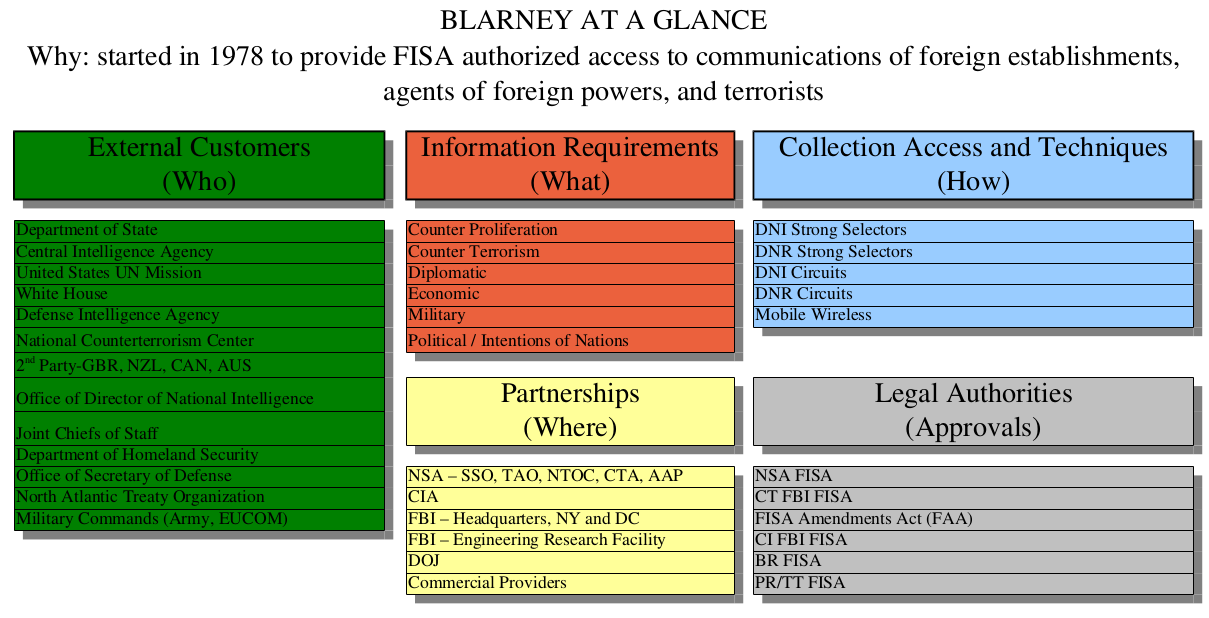
Blarney at a glance (readable version)

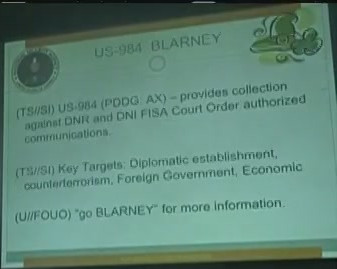
Blarney SIGAD

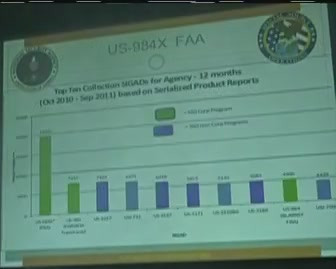
Blarney chart - top 10 collection SIGADs

== See also ==
- 2013 mass surveillance disclosures
