= Ragtime (code name) =

Ragtime or RAGTIME is the code name of four secret surveillance programs conducted by the National Security Agency (NSA) of the United States. These programs date back to at least 2002 and were revealed in March 2013 in the book Deep State: Inside the Government Secrecy Industry, by Marc Ambinder and D.B. Grady.

These special programs are conducted under the code name RAGTIME (also abbreviated as RT), and are divided into several subcomponents. It's said that about fifty companies have provided data to this domestic collection program.

RAGTIME consists of four parts: RAGTIME-A, RAGTIME-B, RAGTIME-C, and RAGTIME-P.

According to the book Deep State, only about three dozen NSA officials have access to RAGTIME's intercept data on domestic counter-terrorism collection, though outside the agency some 1000 people have knowledge of the program's details. Internally, the NSA has a compliance staff of about four or five people to ensure the program stays within laws and regulations.

Under the RAGTIME-P program, the FISA court and the US Attorney General both certify a slate of approved targets, which include bulk data, like phone call logs and records that can be collected around those targets. Apparently, RAGTIME-P can process as many as 50 different data sets at one time.

All intercepted data go to the NSA headquarters in Fort Meade, Maryland, where a program called XKeyscore processes them and sending them to different so-called "production lines" that deal with targets, like counterterrorism or specific countries. These processed data are stored in different NSA databases like PINWALE for internet content and MARINA for internet metadata, which is generally stored for five years.

Originally, RAGTIME only applied to NSA Establishment FISA data, but in 2002 this was changed and since then the program encompasses both NSA Establishment FISA and FBI FISA data. According to Marc Ambinder, RAGTIME refers to phonecall and e-mail content intercepted under FISA authority.

== See also ==
- STELLARWIND
- PRISM
