= Boundless Informant =

Big data analysis and visualization tool used by the NSA

Boundless Informant (stylized as BOUNDLESSINFORMANT) is a big data analysis and data visualization tool used by the United States National Security Agency (NSA). It gives NSA managers summaries of the NSA's worldwide data collection activities by counting metadata. The existence of this tool was revealed in the Snowden disclosures. Those disclosed documents were in a direct contradiction to the NSA's assurance to United States Congress that it does not collect any type of data on millions of Americans.

Whether Boundless Informant is still in use as of 2026 is not publicly known.

== History ==
Intelligence gathered by the United States government inside the United States or specifically targeting US citizens is legally required to be gathered in compliance with the Foreign Intelligence Surveillance Act of 1978 (FISA) and under the authority of the Foreign Intelligence Surveillance Court (FISA court).

NSA global data mining projects have existed for decades, but recent programs of intelligence gathering and analysis that include data gathered from inside the United States such as PRISM were enabled by changes to US surveillance law introduced under President George W. Bush and renewed under President Barack Obama in December 2012.

Boundless Informant was first publicly revealed on June 8, 2013, after classified documents about the program were leaked to The Guardian. This report contained a Top Secret heat map produced by the Boundless Informant program summarizing data records from 504 separate DNR and DNI collection sources or SIGADs. In the map, countries that are under surveillance are assigned a color from green to red (which corresponds to intensity of surveillance).

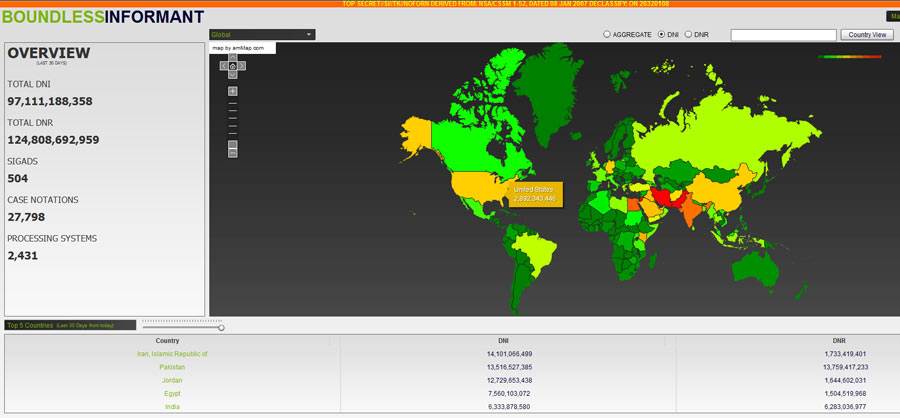
The worldwide heat map from the NSA's data visualisation tool BOUNDLESSINFORMANT, showing that during a 30-day period, 97 billion internet data records (DNI) and 125 billion telephone data records (DNR) were collected.

As this map shows that almost 3 billion data elements from inside the United States were captured by the NSA over a 30-day period ending in March 2013, Snowden stated that this tool was collecting more information on Americans located within the United States than on Russians in Russia. Snowden stated that he had raised concerns about this with his superiors at the NSA beginning in October 2012, specifically with two superiors in the Hawaii regional base of the NSA Threat Operations Center and two superiors in the Technology Directorate of the NSA. Snowden states that he brought up these concerns through the Dissent Channel.

Snowden added that coworkers often were "astonished to learn" about this detail and did not wish to know any more about the program, and that until April 2012 he often asked these colleagues "What do you think the public would do if this was on the front page?" Vanee Vines, an NSA spokesperson, stated that "After extensive investigation, including interviews with his former NSA supervisors and co-workers, we have not found any evidence to support Mr. Snowden's contention that he brought these matters to anyone's attention."

The first publication about Boundless Informant was followed by screenshots from this program showing charts with details about the data that NSA allegedly collected from several European countries between December 10, 2012 and January 8, 2013. These charts were published by a major news outlet from each of these countries:

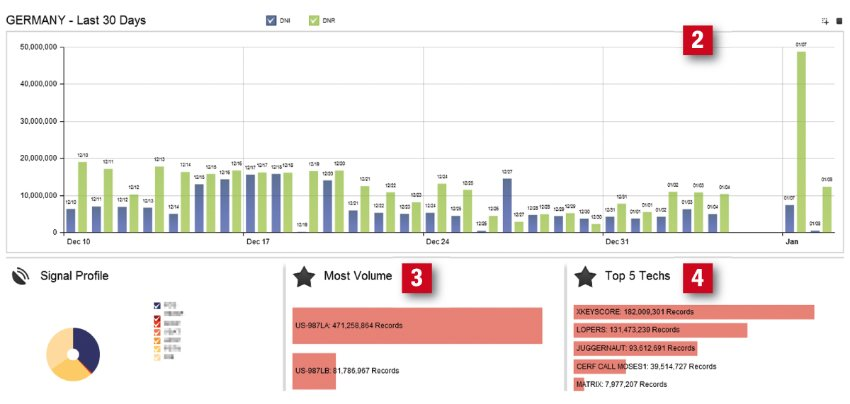
Screenshot from the BOUNDLESSINFORMANT tool, showing charts with different details about data collection related to Germany. The upper chart shows internet (blue bars) and telephony (green bars) data, the bottom center chart mentions two SIGADs and the most important "tech" in the bottom right section is the XKeyscore program.

- July 29, 2013: Germany: a big chart about this country, showing more than 552 million telephony and internet data, alongside four smaller charts about the Netherlands, France, Spain and Italy were published by the magazine Der Spiegel.
- October 20, 2013: France: a chart showing almost 70 million telephony metadata was published by the newspaper Le Monde.
- October 28, 2013: Spain: a chart showing 60 million telephony metadata was published by the newspaper El Mundo.
- November 19, 2013: Norway: a chart showing 33 million telephony metadata was published by the tabloid paper Dagbladet.
- December 6, 2013: Italy: a chart showing almost 46 million telephony metadata was published by the tabloid paper L'Espresso.
- February 8, 2014: Netherlands: a chart showing 1.8 million telephony metadata was published by the newspaper NRC Handelsblad.

Initially, these media wrote that the BoundlessInformant charts showed how many phone calls the NSA intercepted from a particular country. A first correction of this interpretation is that the program doesn't count the content of phone calls, but only the metadata thereof (see below).

A second correction is about by whom and where these data were collected. On August 5, a week after the publication of a chart from BoundlessInformant in Germany, the German intelligence agency (BND) said that they collected these data from foreign communications, related to military operations abroad. A similar statement was made by the Norwegian Intelligence Service, after a chart about Norway was published on November 19. On February 4, 2014, the Dutch government revealed that the 1.8 million metadata in the chart about the Netherlands were not collected by NSA, but instead by the Dutch Military Intelligence and Security Service (MIVD), also to support military operations, which almost led to the resignation of the Dutch interior minister.

On October 29, 2013, NSA-director Keith B. Alexander declared that accusations in French, Spanish and Italian media about NSA intercepting millions of phone calls from these countries are "completely false". He added that "This is not information that we collected on European citizens. It represents information that we and our NATO allies have collected in defense of our countries and in support of military operations."

== Technology ==
Although the initial reports in European media stated that the various charts presented the numbers of phone calls intercepted by NSA, a PowerPoint presentation and a FAQ document published by The Guardian say that Boundless Informant is counting and analysing DNI (internet) and DNR (telephony) metadata records passing through the NSA's signals intelligence systems, and are therefore not showing how much content of internet and telephone communications is intercepted.

Data analyzed by Boundless Informant includes electronic surveillance program records and telephone call metadata records stored in an NSA data archive called GM-PLACE. It does not include FISA data, according to the FAQ memo. PRISM, a government codename for a collection effort known officially as US-984XN, which was revealed at the same time as Boundless Informant, is one source of DNR data.

According to published slides, Boundless Informant leverages Free and Open Source Software—and is therefore "available to all NSA developers"—and corporate services hosted in the cloud. The tool uses HDFS, MapReduce, and Accumulo (formerly Cloudbase) for data processing.

== See also ==
- List of government surveillance projects
- NSA warrantless surveillance (2001–07)
- Stellar Wind
