= Human Science Operations Cell =

Division of the Government Communications Headquarters

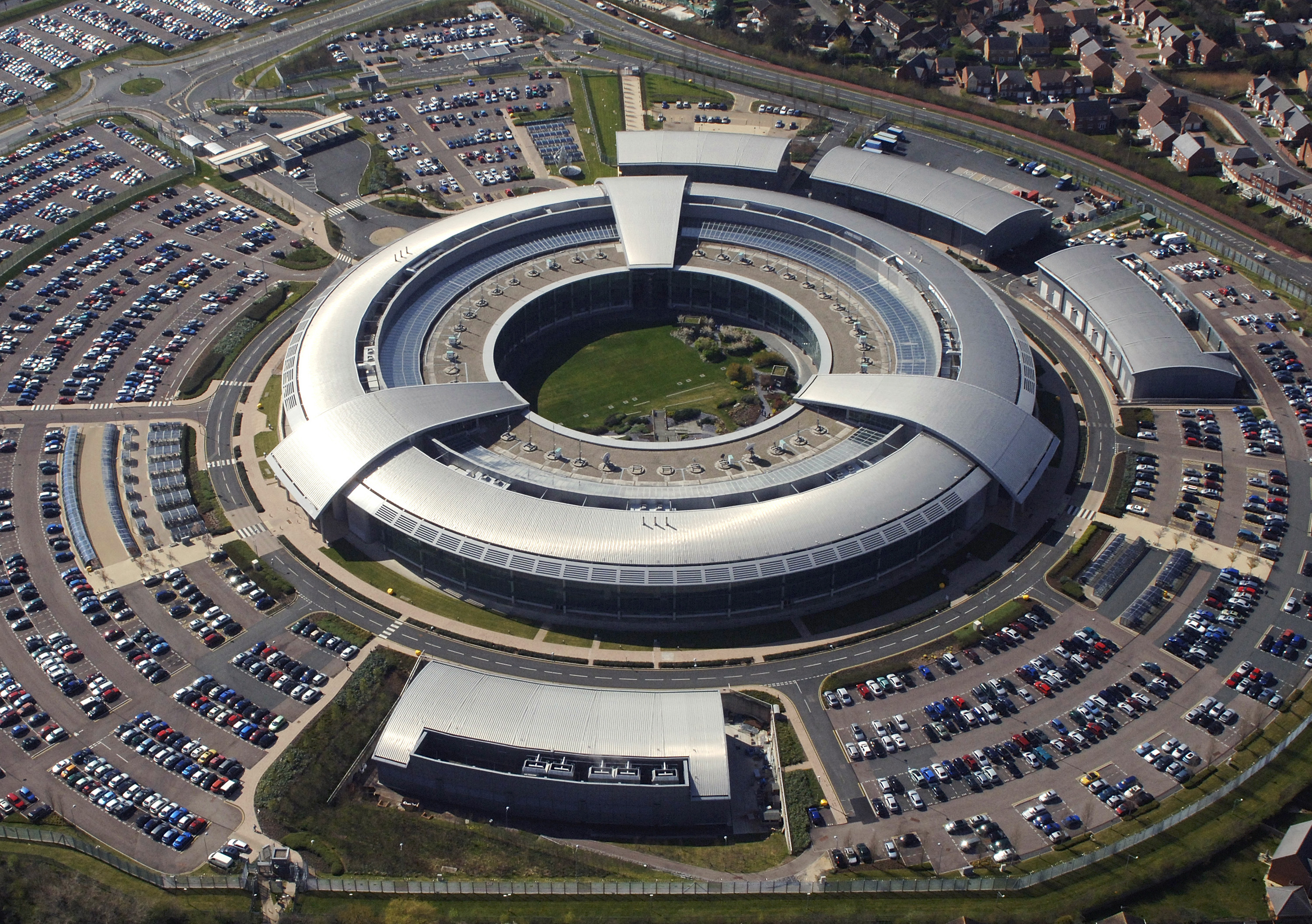
Aerial image of the Government Communications Headquarters which houses the Human Science Operations Cell.

The Human Science Operations Cell (HSOC) is a division of the British signals intelligence agency, Government Communications Headquarters (GCHQ). The HSOC focus on “online human intelligence” and “strategic influence and disruption.”

The existence of the HSOC was revealed as part of the global surveillance disclosures by the former National Security Agency contractor, Edward Snowden.

== See also ==
- Joint Threat Research Intelligence Group
- Joint Operations Cell
