= 811 Tenth Avenue =

Skyscraper in Manhattan, New York

Coordinates: 40.7671°N 73.9908°W

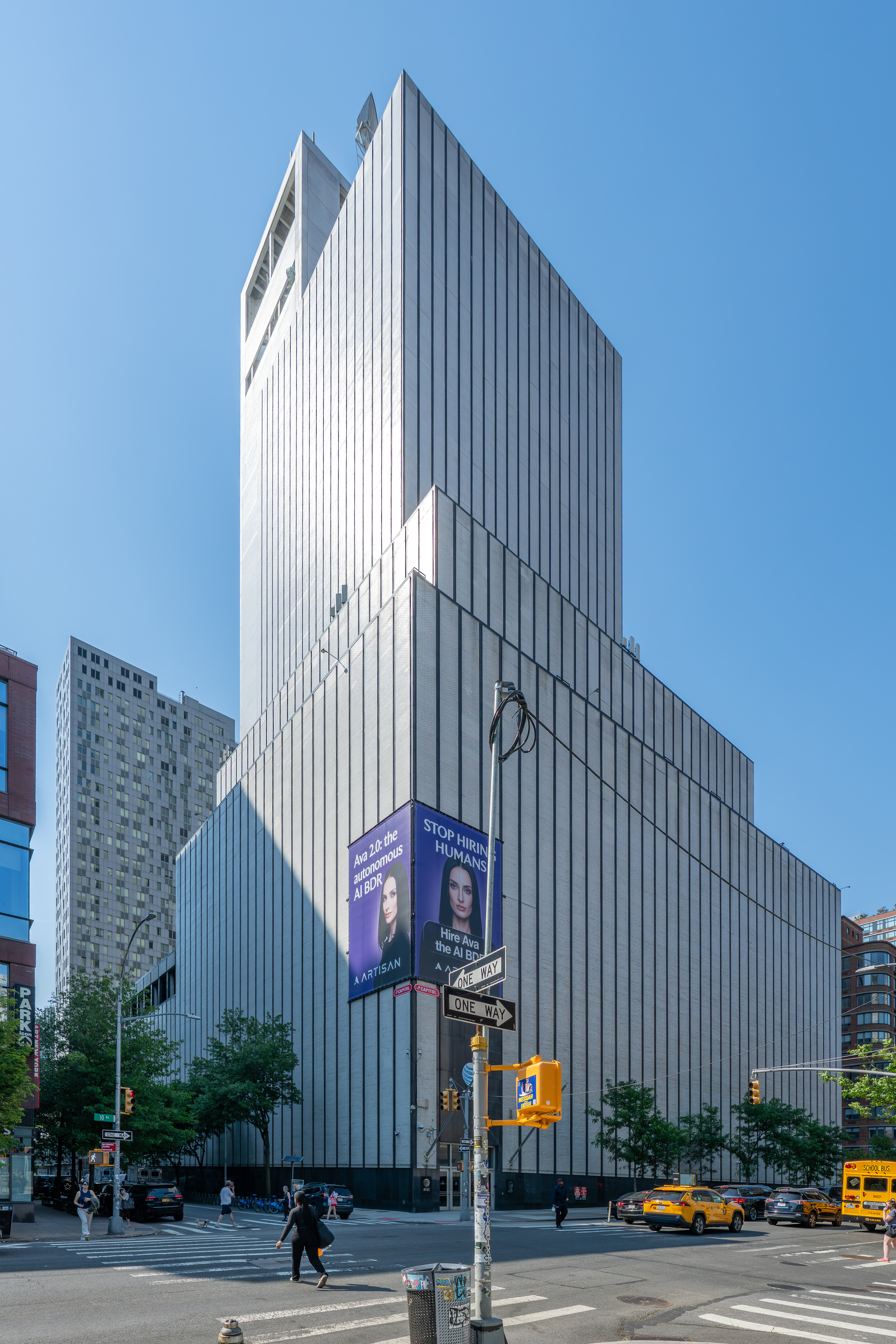
AT&T Switching Center (2026)

811 Tenth Avenue (also called the AT&T Switching Center) is a 370-foot-tall (110 m) skyscraper in the Hell's Kitchen neighborhood of Manhattan in New York City. It was designed by Kahn & Jacobs and completed in 1964, occupying the full block of 10th Avenue's western side between West 53rd and 54th Streets. Windowless and designed to withstand a nuclear blast, it was built by AT&T to house telephone switching equipment. "It was the first of several windowless buildings to be constructed" by the telecommunications company in Manhattan, "and it caused considerable controversy", the New York Times wrote in 1975.

After 1985, it was used by the National Security Agency to eavesdrop on U.S. citizens under its Fairview surveillance program.

In 2000, AT&T upgraded the facility from a "hardened Telco data center" to an "AT&T Internet Data Center," according to an AT&T fact sheet on the facility.

As of 2014, it contained four 2,000-kilowatt generators, along with three 20,000-gallon storage tanks for fuel oil, to provide power during interruptions to the grid.
