= National Cyber Force =

British national offensive cyber agency

National Cyber Force (NCF)
Agency overview
- Headquarters: Samlesbury Aerodrome
- Agency executive: Air Vice-Marshal Tim Neal-Hopes, Commander
- Parent agency: Part of Ministry of Defence, DSTL, Secret Intelligence Service, and GCHQ
- Website: www.gov.uk/government/organisations/national-cyber-force

The National Cyber Force (NCF) is intended to consolidate offensive cyber activity in the United Kingdom, by enabling an offensive capability to combat security threats, hostile states, terror groups, extremism, hackers, disinformation and election interference.

== Organisation ==
The specialist unit is a joint initiative between the Ministry of Defence (MOD) and GCHQ, one of the British intelligence agencies.

Around £76m will be invested in the NCF in its first year.

It will operate alongside the National Cyber Security Centre (NCSC), which primarily concentrates on defensive cyber activities to protect government departments, strategic infrastructure and industry.

Its first commander was named in The Economist as James Babbage, who took the role after a long career at GCHQ. In 2023 Babbage was succeeded by Air Vice-Marshal Tim Neal-Hopes, formerly director Cyber, Intelligence and Information Integration at the United Kingdom's Strategic Command.

== History ==
Plans for the unit were reported in the media in September 2018. It has since been reported to have been delayed because of "distractions caused by uncertainties over Brexit and frequent changes of ministers and secretaries of state in the MoD" and turf wars between the MOD and GCHQ.

An April 2021 report produced by academics from King's College London and the Offensive Cyber Working Group has produced a set of recommendations for the NCF, with an aim to increase public debate on offensive cyber in the UK.

In October 2021 it was announced that the NCF will be based in the village of Samlesbury, as part of a new 'cyber corridor'.

On 20 November 2026, General Sir Rob Magowan, head of the UK's Cyber and Specialist Operations Command, confirmed in an interview with Sky News that the National Cyber Force was conducting offensive cyber operations against Russia, China, Iran and North Korea. He said that the cyber activities of these countries posed a threat to UK security. Magowan added that British offensive cyber operations were intended to impose significant costs on adversaries. He did not disclose any specific targets or provide further details about the operations. The interview offered a rare public insight into the UK's covert offensive cyber activities.

== See also ==
- Joint Operations Cell
- Joint Threat Research Intelligence Group
- National Cyber Crime Unit
- UK cyber security community
- United States Cyber Command
