= Special Source Operations =

Division of the NSA

Special Source Operations (SSO) is a division in the US National Security Agency (NSA) which is responsible for all programs aimed at collecting data from major fiber-optic cables and switches, both inside the US and abroad, and also through corporate partnerships. Its existence was revealed through documents provided by Edward Snowden to media outlets in 2013 and, according to him, it is the "crown jewel" of the NSA.

== History ==
The program began in 2006, according to one of Snowden's documents, when the NSA was collecting the equivalent of "one Library of Congress every 14.4 seconds". The Washington Post described the official seal of the SSO division as something "that might have been parody: an eagle with all the world's cables in its grasp."

== Notable programs ==
The five biggest collection programs of the Special Source Operations division are codenamed:

- DANCINGOASIS
- SPINNERET
- MOONLIGHTPATH
- INCENSER
- AZUREPHOENIX

Other known programs include:

- PRISM – front-door collection using Foreign Intelligence Surveillance Act (FISA) orders
- MUSCULAR – back-door collection from Google and Yahoo private clouds
- Upstream collection – which includes:
  - FAIRVIEW
  - BLARNEY
  - STORMBREW
  - OAKSTAR

== See also ==
- Special Collection Service
- Tailored Access Operations
