= Troy Wolverton =

American journalist

- Born: June 13, 1971 (age 55); San Antonio, Texas
- Education: University of Texas at Austin, University of Missouri
- Occupations: Columnist, journalist
- Title: Personal Technology Columnist, San Jose Mercury News
- Spouse: Tara

Troy Wolverton (born June 13, 1971, in San Antonio, Texas) is an American journalist, and the personal technology columnist for the San Jose Mercury News. He is an occasional commentator on news programs such as the PBS NewsHour.

Prior to his current post, Wolverton was a senior writer for TheStreet.com, and a writer for CNET. He began his career in journalism as a Web editor at the Mercury News.

== Education ==
Wolverton has a bachelor's degree in government from the University of Texas at Austin and a master's in journalism from the University of Missouri.

== Professional ==
Wolverton is a technology and business journalist who writes Tech Files, a weekly consumer technology column in the San Jose Mercury News. In addition to Tech Files, Wolverton writes articles about the digital home and certain cutting edge technologies.

Previously, Wolverton covered Apple and the video game industry for the Mercury News and, before that, for TheStreet.com. He began his tenure at TheStreet as a retail and e-commerce reporter. During that time, he wrote a series of stories about eBay's use of stock options that won a Best in Business award from the Society of American Business Editors and Writers and was a finalist for a Loeb award.

Wolverton joined TheStreet after working as an e-commerce reporter for CNET News.com.

== Awards and honors ==
Journalism awards:

- Best in Business Awards, Winner (2009). Part of a team at the Mercury News recognized by SABEW for its coverage of Microsoft's offer to buy Yahoo.
- Gerald Loeb Awards, Finalist (2004). Recognized for series about stock options practices at eBay.
- Best in Business Awards, Winner (2004). Recognized for eBay stock options series.
- Online Journalism Awards, Finalist (2003). Recognized for eBay stock options series.
- Society of Professional Journalists, First Place (2000). Recognized by Northern California chapter for breaking news coverage.
- Computer Press Awards, Finalist (2000). Recognized in the Best Online News Story category for story about independent merchants offering weapons and porn for sale on Amazon.com.
