= Utt (surname) =

Utt is a surname, and may refer to:

- Adelbert L. Utt (1856–1936), American politician from Wisconsin
- Ben Utt (born 1959), American football player
- Hannah Pearl Utt (born 1987), American filmmaker
- James B. Utt (1899–1970), American politician
- Kenneth Utt, American film producer
