= Dishfire =

Covert global surveillance collection system and database

Dishfire (stylised DISHFIRE) is a covert global surveillance collection system and database run by the United States of America's National Security Agency (NSA) and the United Kingdom's Government Communications Headquarters (GCHQ) that collects hundreds of millions of text messages on a daily basis from around the world. A related analytic tool is known as Prefer.

== Details ==
The database is operated by the following agencies:

- United States of America – National Security Agency (NSA)
- United Kingdom – Government Communications Headquarters (GCHQ)

The existence of the database was revealed in 2014 based on documents disclosed by whistleblower Edward Snowden. According to Snowden's documents, Britain's Government Communications Headquarters (GCHQ) has been given full access to the Dishfire database, which the agency uses to obtain personal information of Britons by exploiting a legal loophole.

== Scope of surveillance ==
Each day, Dishfire collects the following amounts of data:

- Geolocation data of more than 76,000 text messages and other travel information
- Over 110,000 names, gathered from electronic business cards
- Over 800,000 financial transactions that are either gathered from text-to-text payments or from linking credit cards to phone users
- Details of 1.6 million border crossings based on the interception of network roaming alerts
- Over 5 million missed call alerts
- About 200 million text messages from around the world

The press highlighted some quotes from the internal presentations highlighting the intent of this operation: one leaked GCHQ document said that DISHFIRE “collects pretty much everything it can, so you can see SMS from a selector which is not targeted.” The bulk collection was therefore suggested in this document as “particularly useful for the development of new targets, since it is possible to examine the content of messages sent months or even years before the target was known to be of interest.” (emphasis in original)

In response, a spokeswoman of the NSA describes the database as follows: "Dishfire is a system that processes and stores lawfully collected SMS data. Because some SMS data of US persons may at times be incidentally collected in NSA’s lawful foreign intelligence mission, privacy protections for US persons exist across the entire process concerning the use, handling, retention and dissemination of SMS data in Dishfire."

== Data processing ==
Dishfire is typically exploited with an analytical tool known as the Prefer program (stylised PREFER), which processes SMS messages to extract information including contacts from missed call alerts, location from roaming and travel alerts, financial information from bank alerts and payments, and names from electronic business cards.

== Reactions ==
A Vodafone representative declared in the breaking news story on Channel 4 that “It's the first we’ve heard about it and naturally we’re shocked and surprised.” He went on to say that Dishfire was probably circumventing UK law. According to Channel 4's Geoff White, "the Dishfire system gives GCHQ a legal loophole to get such information without needing a RIPA request. That's because the text messages are gathered and stored by the NSA – and GCHQ's access to foreign intelligence agencies' stash of data is not covered by any UK law." Former UK Interception Commissioner Sir Swinton Thomas drew an analogy between this method of circumventing the UK interception laws and torture in a foreign country, adding that it was a “different area of course, but the concept is very similar”.

== Gallery ==
Top secret presentation that includes details of Dishfire

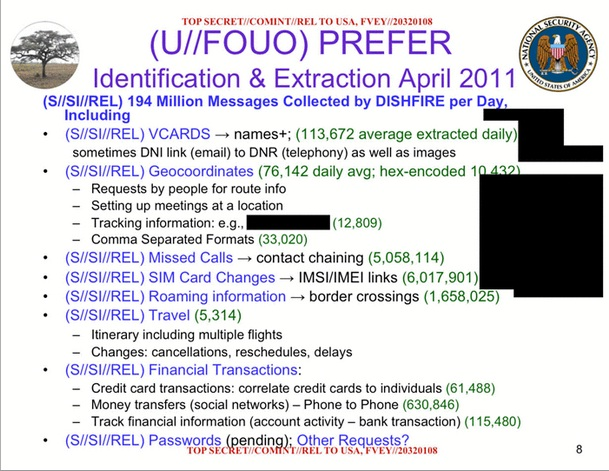
Every day, about 200 million text messages are entered into the system

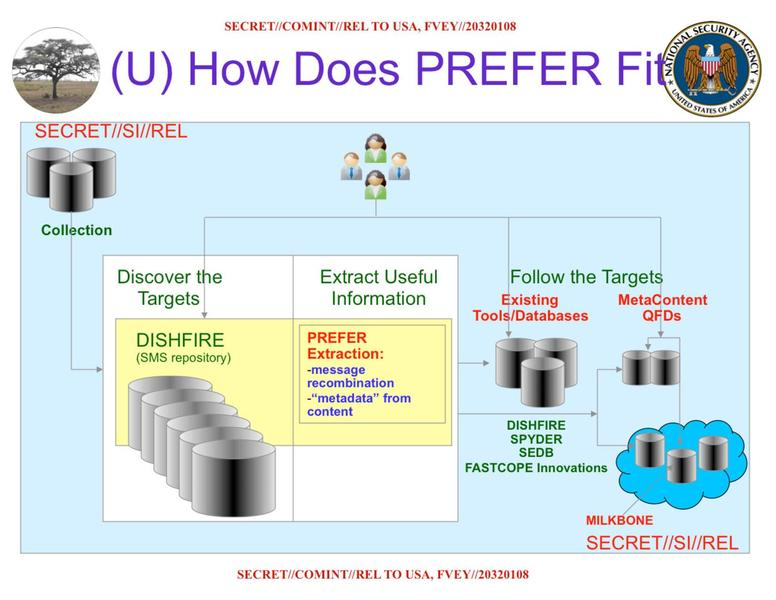
A diagram showing how data in the Dishfire repository is processed and analyzed

== See also ==
- FASCIA (database)
- Five Eyes
- Mass surveillance
  - Mass surveillance in the United Kingdom
  - Mass surveillance in the United States
- MUSCULAR, another NSA–GCHQ collaboration targeting Google and Yahoo private cloud traffic
- Stateroom (surveillance program)
