= Insider Threat Program =

The Insider Threat Program is the United States government's response to the massive data leaks of the early twenty-first century, notably the diplomatic cables leaked by Chelsea Manning but before the NSA leaks by Edward Snowden. The program was established under the mandate of Executive Order 13587 issued by Barack Obama.

== Effect on whistle-blowing ==
Concern has been expressed that the program does not provide any latitude for whistle-blowers. Senator Chuck Grassley is concerned that the program is merely a way to crack down on whistle-blowers.

=== Senate hearing ===
The FBI were asked to a Senate hearing to establish the parameters of the FBI ITP, and the methods for avoiding targeting whistle blowers. Ten minutes into the hearing the FBI witnesses walked out.
