= Unified Targeting Tool =

Database query tool used by NSA

The Unified Targeting Tool (UTT) is a software program used by the US National Security Agency to select targets for surveillance. It is mentioned in the Snowden disclosures as part of the PRISM program, and in other documents.

The screen captures show that the program is a web-based application accessible through an intranet, Internet Explorer 6 is shown in one sample. The tool has the ability to query at least one database, NYMROD, which appears to be a database of names. The screen captures suggest that the tool has the ability to filter by nationality (it is possible to enter multiple nationalities), location, and "target extension" (the given example is "D Diplomatic"). The analyst is also able to enter a classification string, and include a declassification date, in the sample given: 20320108 is code for January 8, 2032. There is a category labeled "Intelligence Purpose Information," in which the analyst is able to select a geopolitical area, topic and subtopic. The screen captures suggest that the tool gives the analyst the option of suggesting how often to forward new intelligence, and enter a reason for any higher priority requests.

The tool has the ability to build queries regardless of whether the target's name is known. The target may be a person, but that may not always be the case. The analyst must enter a short justification, and select a foreignness factor. Foreign factors include: "person is a user of storage media seized outside the US," "the person has indicated that he is located outside the US," "In direct contact w/ tgt oversees, no info to show proposed tgt in US," among others. The presence of a ZIP code field on one of the released screen captures suggests that the tool may have the ability to collect within the United States, and not be limited to foreign intelligence gathering. There is a field for "Special Authorization," presumably for targets that the analyst needs special approval to select, such as US persons, or foreigners presently located within the US. The screen captures suggest that the tool requires the analyst to enter a start and end date for the authorization, and a separate end date for the targeting itself to cease.

According to still undisclosed NSA documents from the collection of Edward Snowden, the UTT replaced the telephony targeting system OCTAVE in 2011.

== Gallery ==
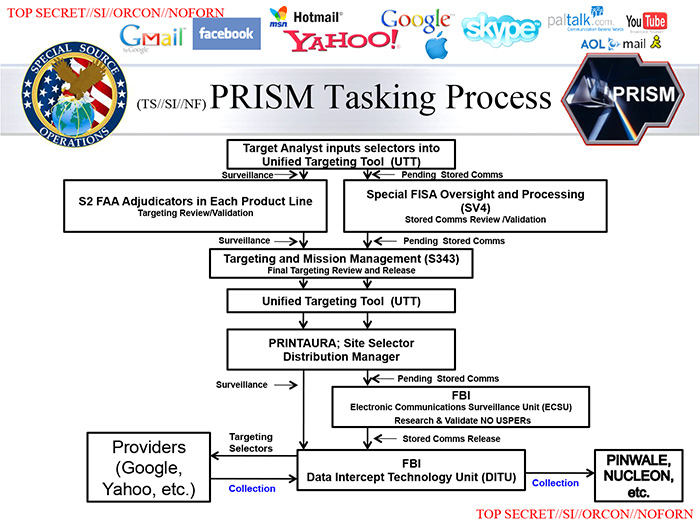
A reference to UTT as part of the PRISM tasking process

A screenshot of the UTT

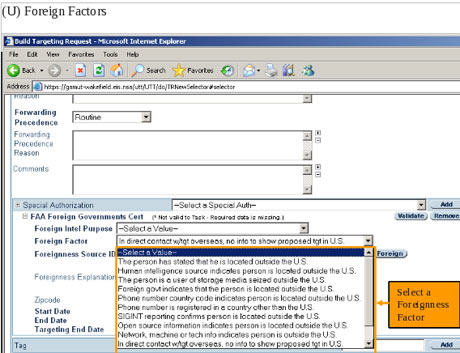
A second screenshot showing the interface and foreignness criteria.

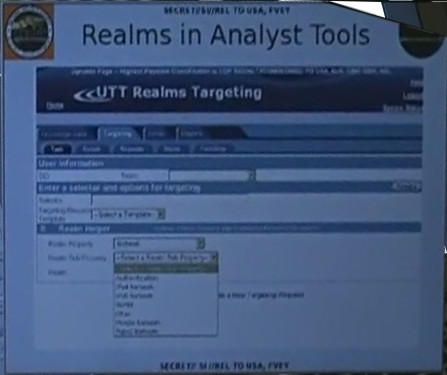
UTT Screen Capture, from a SIGDEV presentation (not fully legible)

== See also ==
- 2013 mass surveillance disclosures
- PRISM
- XKeyscore
