= Squeaky Dolphin =

Program developed by the British Government Communications Headquarters

Squeaky Dolphin is a program developed by the Government Communications Headquarters (GCHQ), a British intelligence and security organization, to collect and analyze data from social media networks. The program was first revealed to the general public on NBC on 27 January 2014 based on documents previously leaked by Edward Snowden.

== Scope of surveillance ==
According to a document of the GCHQ dated August 2012, the program enables broad, real-time surveillance of the following items:

- YouTube video views
- The Like button on Facebook. Facebook has since then encrypted the data.
- Blogspot/Blogger visits
- Twitter, which has however encrypted its communications since this presentation was made

The program can be supplemented with commercially available analytic software to determine which videos are popular among residents of specific cities. The dashboard software chosen was made by Splunk.

The presentation, which was originally shown to an NSA audience and was made public by the NBC, contains a note saying the program was "Not interested in individuals just broad trends!". However, "according to other Snowden documents" obtained by NBC, in 2010, "GCHQ exploited unencrypted data from Twitter to identify specific users around the world and target them with propaganda."

== See also ==
- Five Eyes
- MUSCULAR — program for capturing Google and Yahoo private cloud data
