= SIGINT Activity Designator =

Identifier for a collector of signals intelligence

A SIGINT Activity Designator (or SIGAD) identifies a signals intelligence (SIGINT) line of collection activity associated with a signals collection station, such as a base or a ship. For example, the SIGAD for Menwith Hill in the UK is USD1000. SIGADs are used by the signals intelligence agencies of Australia, Canada, New Zealand, the United Kingdom, and the United States (the Five Eyes).

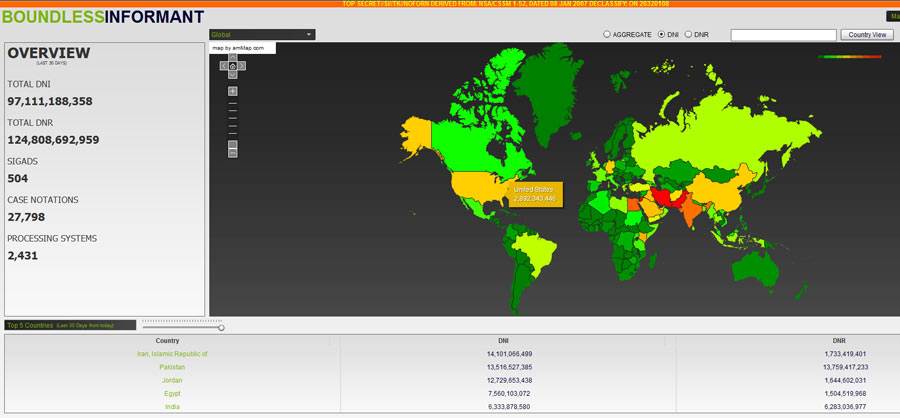
Snapshot of Boundless Informant global heat map of data collection

There are several thousand SIGADs including the substation SIGADs denoted with a trailing alpha character. Several dozen of these are significant. The leaked Boundless Informant reporting screenshot showed that it summarized 504 active SIGADs during a 30-day period in March 2013.

== General format ==
A SIGAD consists of five to eight case insensitive alphanumeric characters. It takes the general form of an alphanumeric designator normally composed of a two- or three-letter prefix followed by one to three numbers. Often a dash is used to separate the alphabetic and numeric characters in the primary part of the designator, but less frequently a space is used as a separator or the alphabetic and numeric characters are concatenated together. An additional alphabetic character can be added to denote a sub-designator for a subset of the primary unit, such as a detachment. Lastly, a numeric character can be added after the aforementioned alphabetic to provide for a sub-sub-designator.

In the examples below an X represents an alphabetic character and an N represents a numeric character that are part of the primary designator. Likewise, an x represents an alphabetic character and an n represents a numeric character that are part of a sub-designator. Here are valid generalized examples of SIGADs:

- XX-N
- XX-NN
- XX-NNN
- XX-NNNN
- XXX-N
- XXX-NN
- XXX-NNN
- XXX-NNNN
- XX-Nx
- XX-Nxn
- XX-NNx
- XX-NNxn
- XX-NNNx
- XX-NNNxn
- XX-NNNNx
- XX-NNNNxn
- XXX-Nx
- XXX-Nxn
- XXX-NNx
- XXX-NNxn
- XXX-NNNx
- XXX-NNNxn
- XXX-NNNNx
- XXX-NNNNxn

The first two characters show which country operates the particular SIGINT facility, which can be US for the United States, UK for the United Kingdom, CA for Canada, AU for Australia and NZ for New Zealand. A third letter shows what sort of staff runs the station. SIGADs beginning with US without a third letter are used for intercept facilities run by the NSA.

== PRISM SIGAD ==
One prominent SIGAD as of April 2013 is US-984XN, with an unclassified codename of PRISM. It is "the number one source of raw intelligence used for NSA analytic reports" according to National Security Agency sources in a document leaked by Edward Snowden. The President's Daily Brief, an all-source intelligence product, cited SIGAD US-984XN as a source in 1,477 items in 2012. The U.S. government operates the PRISM electronic surveillance collection program through NSA's Special Source Operations, an alliance with trusted telecommunications providers.

== SIGADs for spy ships ==
The declassified SIGAD for the USS Liberty (AGTR-5) was USN-855. The USS Liberty incident occurred on 8 June 1967, during the Six-Day War, when Israeli Air Force jet fighter aircraft and Israeli Navy motor torpedo boats attacked the USS Liberty in international waters.

The USS Pueblo (AGER-2) was a technical research ship, which was boarded and captured by North Korean forces on 23 January 1968, in what is known as the Pueblo incident. The declassified SIGAD for the NSA Direct Support Unit (DSU) from the Naval Security Group (NSG) on the USS Pueblo patrol involved in the incident was USN-467Y. The USS Pueblo, which officially remains a commissioned vessel of the United States Navy, is the only ship of the U.S. Navy currently being held captive.

== Vietnam War SIGADs ==
The following are the Vietnam War-era declassified SIGADs from inside South Vietnam during the period of 1969 to 1975:

- USA-32 Danang
- USA-522J Cam Ranh Bay
- USA-561 Tan Son Nhuh
- USA-562 Phu Cat
- USA-563 Danang
- USM-604 Nha Trang
- USM-605 Camp Eagle
- USM-607 Can Tho
- USM-613 Nha Tranh
- USM-616 Xuan Loc
- USM-624 Long Thanh
- USM-626 Bien Hoa
- USM-628 Bien Roa
- USM-631 Phouc Vinh
- USM-633 Cu Chi
- USM-634 Pleiku
- USM-636 Di An
- USM-638 Cam Ranh Bay
- USM-645 Quang Tri
- USM-649 Chu Lai
- USM-653 Nha Trang
- USM-704 Saigon
- USM-794 Saigon
- USM-808 Phu Bai
- USN-414 Danang
- USN-842 Phu Bai
- USN-843 Danang

Some locations have multiple SIGADs due to different types of collection activities and/or collection at different times during the period. The SIGADs beginning with USA were operated by the United States Air Force's United States Air Force Security Service (USAFSS). The SIGADs beginning with USM were operated by the United States Army's Army Security Agency (ASA). Lastly, the SIGADs beginning with USN were operated by the United States Navy's Naval Security Group (NAVSECGRU). All three of these units have been merged into other units or inactivated.

The above list consists of the higher-echelon SIGADs. It does not include the numerous miscellaneous and temporary detachments, or direction finding stations belonging to major units or sites unless that detachment or site was the only one stationed in South Vietnam. Many of the "dets" were short-lived, often formed to support ongoing MACV operations or forward deployments of combat operational or maneuver units. These detachments usually were designated by a letter suffix attached to the higher-echelon SIGAD such as "USM-633J," which was a detachment of the 372d Radio Research Company, USM-633, supporting the United States Army's 25th Infantry Division.

=== Supporting Southeast Asia SIGADs ===
The following declassified SIGADs were highly relevant to the Vietnam Campaign, but were located in areas outside of South Vietnam in Southeast Asia.

- USA-29 7th RRFS, 6994th SS, Udorn Royal Thai Air Force Base, Udorn, Thailand
- USA-57 6922nd Security Wing (SW), 6925 Security Squadron, Clark AFB, Philippines
- USM-7 7th RRFS, Ramasun Station, Udon Thani Province, Thailand
- USM-9 USASA 9 RRFS, Philippines
- USN-27 U.S. Naval Communication Station, Philippines, San Miguel, Philippines
- USN-467N USS Maddox

Again, detachments are not listed separately. In the case of the USS Maddox, naval Direct Support Units (DSUs) used the SIGAD USN-467 as a generic designator for their missions. Each specific patrol received a letter suffix for its duration. The subsequent mission would receive the next letter in an alphabetical sequence. Thus, SIGAD USN-467N specifically designates the USS Maddox patrol involved with the Gulf of Tonkin incident.

== Joint Base SIGADs ==
In November 2005, the US Congress performed a fifth round of Base Realignment and Closure. This 2005 law also created twelve joint bases by merging adjacent installations belonging to different services in an effort to reduce costs and improve efficiencies.

Joint bases with a primarily SIGINT mission have SIGADs that begin with USJ. A joint base would have a primary SIGAD in the general form of USJ-NNN, where NNN are numeric characters. An actual example is not given, since these units are currently active.

== See also ==
- Boundless Informant
- National Security Agency
- United States Intelligence Community
