= STORMBREW =

Internet surveillance program

STORMBREW is a secret internet surveillance program of the National Security Agency (NSA) of the United States. It was disclosed in the summer of 2013 as part of the leaks by former NSA contractor Edward Snowden.

The FY 2013 budget for STORMBREW was $46.06 million.

== Scope of the program ==
The program comprises cooperation with a "key corporate partner", which was identified on October 23, 2013 by The Washington Post—quoting NSA historian Matthew Aid—as Verizon. This was confirmed by a joint report by Pro Publica and The New York Times from August 15, 2015.

STORMBREW is an umbrella program involving surveillance of telecommunications. It falls under the category of "Upstream collection", meaning that data is pulled directly from fiber-optic cables and top-level communications infrastructure, which allows access to very high volumes of data. A first pre-selection is done by the telecommunication providers themselves, who select the Internet traffic that most likely contains foreign communications. Then the data is passed on to the NSA, where a second selection is made by briefly copying the traffic and filtering it by using so-called "strong selectors" like phone numbers, e-mail or IP addresses of people and organizations in which NSA is interested.

A map shows that the collection is done entirely within the United States. This corporate partner has servers in Washington, California, Texas, Florida, and in or around New York, Virginia, and Pennsylvania.

== SIGADs ==
STORMBREW consists of the following SIGADs:

Designation	Covername	Legal authority^{See Note}	Key targets	Type of information collected	Remarks
US-3140 (PDDG:TM)	MADCAPOCELOT	Executive Order 12333	The country of Russia and European Terrorism	DNI and metadata through XKEYSCORE, PINWALE and MARINA	
US-983 (PDDG:FL)	STORMBREW		Global	"DNR (Directory ONMR)"; "DNI Collection, limited to the Foreign Intelligence Surveillance Act (FISA) and Foreign Intelligence Surveillance Act of 1978 Amendments Act of 2008, Cyber hit counts on FAA DNI access"	"Key corporate partner with access to international cables, routers, and switches"

Note: SIGADs not otherwise designated are presumed to operate under the legal authority of Section 702 of the FISA Amendments Act (FAA)

Glossary

- Cyber Hit Counts: no explanation has been provided in the source material.
- Directory ONMR: no explanation has been provided in the source material.
- DNI: Digital Network Intelligence.
- DNR: Dial Number Recognition.
- MARINA: An NSA Database of Internet metadata.
- Transit Authority: A legal authority that states communications that transit the United States are collectible, provided that both endpoints are foreign.

== Media Relating to STORMBREW ==
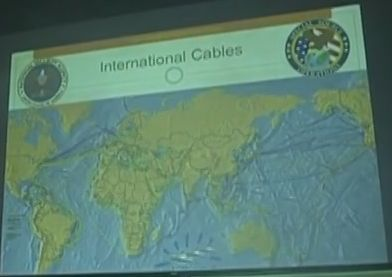
Upstream: Map of International Cables

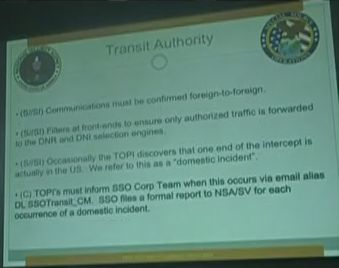
Upstream: Transit Authority

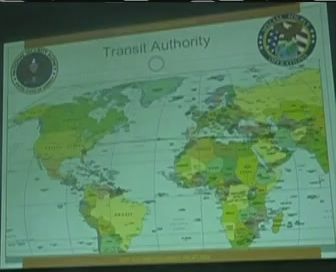
Upstream: Map of Transit Authority

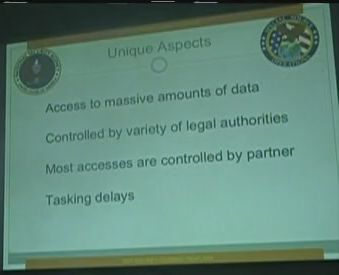
Upstream: Unique Aspects

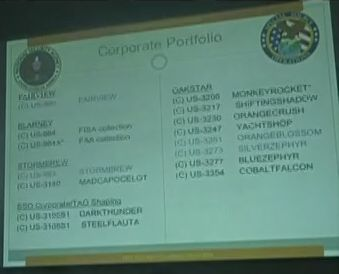
Upstream: Corporate Portfolio

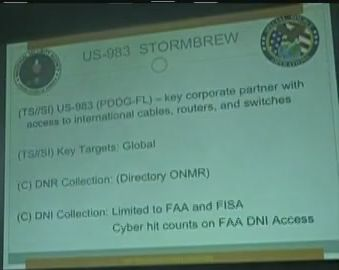
STORMBREW: STORMBREW SIGAD

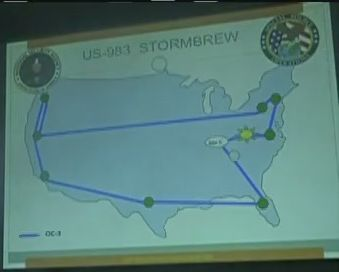
STORMBREW: STORMBREW SIGAD map

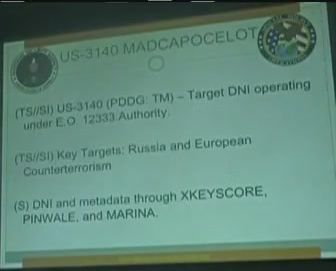
STORMBREW: MADCAPOCELOT
