= Joint Operations Cell =

Joint Operations Cell is a unit of GCHQ, a British signals intelligence agency, and the National Crime Agency (NCA), a United Kingdom national law enforcement agency. It opened in November 2015 with the intention of tackling a range of crime on the Dark Web, initially focusing on child sexual exploitation, but also including international sex trafficking and the sale of drugs and weapons on darknet markets. Its intelligence methods include analysis of data gathered through mass surveillance. Joint Operations Cell is a collaborative effort of GCHQ and NCA, co-located in Warrington.

== History ==
In November 2013, UK Prime Minister David Cameron said UK and US intelligence agencies would help fight child abuse images on the Dark Web that is inaccessible to search engines. He announced plans to create the Joint Operations Cell at the We Protect Children Online Global Summit in December 2014. The opening of a co-located facility in Warrington in November 2015 was announced with a press release, quoting GCHQ director Robert Hannigan and then NCA director Keith Bristow.

== See also ==
- Department of Defense Cyber Crime Center
- Joint Threat Research Intelligence Group
- National Cyber Force
