= Fairview (surveillance program) =

Domestic spying partnership between AT&T and the NSA

FAIRVIEW is a secret program under which the National Security Agency cooperates with the American telecommunications company AT&T in order to collect phone, internet and e-mail data mainly of foreign countries' citizens at major cable landing stations and switching stations inside the United States. The FAIRVIEW program started in 1985, one year after the Bell breakup.

In 2010, the NSA had access to these AT&T facilities:

- 8 internet peering points
- 26 VoIP router facilities
- 1 VoIP hub router facility (with 30 planned)
- 9 submarine cable landing points (with 7 planned)
- 16 4ESS circuit switching stations

Except for the VoIP facilities, most are along U.S. borders.

In 2011, NSA spent $188.9 million on the program, which was twice as much as on its second-largest program, STORMBREW.

In 2013, whistleblower Edward Snowden revealed that the NSA was harvesting the telephone metadata and text messages from over a billion subscribers in China; no precise program name was reported at the time.

Several weeks later, Glenn Greenwald wrote in The Guardian about FAIRVIEW: "The NSA partners with a large US telecommunications company" that "partners with telecoms in the foreign countries, [which] then allow the US company access to those countries' telecommunications systems, and that access is then exploited to direct traffic to the NSA's repositories."

Documents provided by Snowden said the NSA had collected 2.3 billion separate pieces of data from Brazilian users in January 2013.

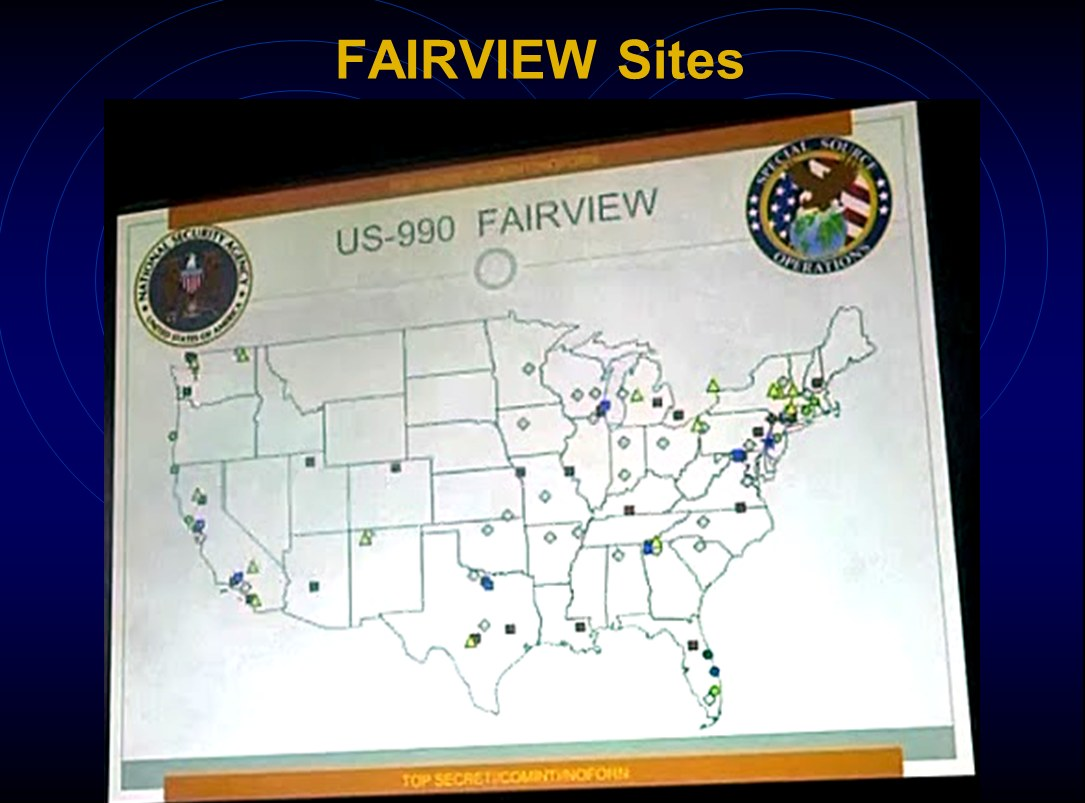
FAIRVIEW: Map shown on Brazilian television in 2013

In 2013, Brazilian television showed a map of FAIRVIEW with markers all over the United States, but without a legend that explained what they stood for.

AT&T was first identified as FAIRVIEW's "key corporate partner" in 2013, by the Washington Post, quoting NSA historian Matthew Aid. This was confirmed in 2015 by a joint report by ProPublica and the New York Times, based upon NSA documents that describe the company as "highly collaborative" and praise the company's "extreme willingness to help".

== Eight peering points ==
The following AT&T facilities, each broadly resembling the windowless skyscraper 33 Thomas Street in Downtown Manhattan, have been alleged to host FAIRVIEW technology for peering points:

- Room 641A in 611 Folsom Street, San Francisco, CA
- 811 Tenth Avenue, New York, NY
- 1122 Third Avenue, Seattle, WA
- 10 South Canal Street, Chicago, IL
- 4211 Bryan Street, Dallas, TX
- AT&T Switching Center, 420 South Grand Avenue, Los Angeles, CA
- 51 Peachtree Center Avenue, Atlanta, GA
- 30 E Street Southwest, Washington, DC

== Legal authorities ==
Various legal authorities authorize the collection of data under the FAIRVIEW program: FISA, which requires individual warrants from the FISA Court, section 702 FAA for when one end of the communications is foreign, and the Transit Authority for when both ends of a communication are foreign.

Under the FAIRVIEW program, AT&T provided the NSA with domestic telephone metadata in bulk, which was authorized under Section 215 of the USA PATRIOT Act. First this was from landline connections, but in 2011, AT&T also started handing over cell phone metadata: 1.1 billion pieces a day.

== Media related to FAIRVIEW ==
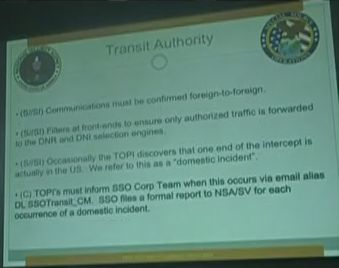
Upstream: Transit Authority

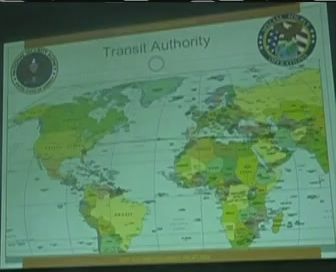
Upstream: Map of Transit Authority

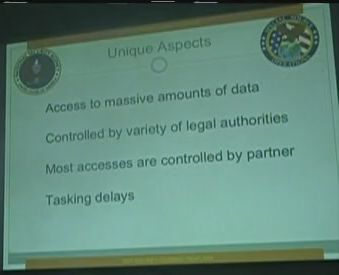
Upstream: Unique Aspects

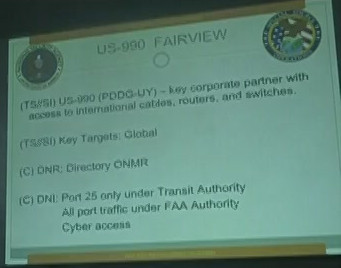
FAIRVIEW: Summary

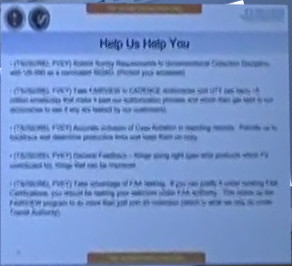
"B-reel" 2nd FAIRVIEW presentation: help us help you

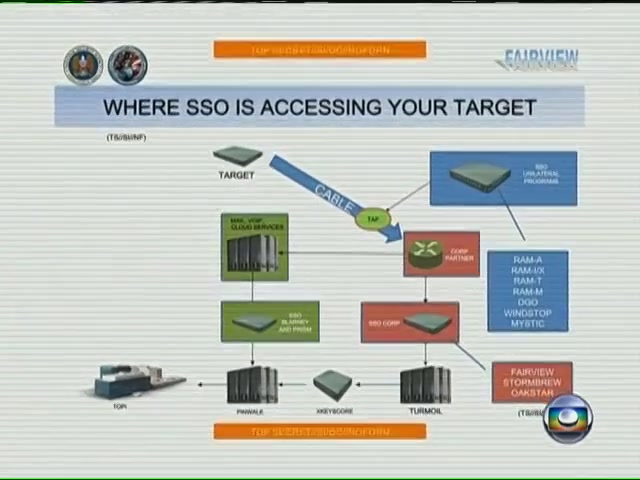
2nd FAIRVIEW presentation: Where SSO is accessing your target
