= OAKSTAR =

US secret internet surveillance program

OAKSTAR is a secret internet surveillance program of the National Security Agency (NSA) of the United States. It was disclosed in 2013 as part of the leaks by former NSA contractor Edward Snowden.

OAKSTAR is an umbrella program involving surveillance of telecommunications. It falls under the category of "Upstream collection", meaning that data is pulled directly from fiber-optic cables and top-level communications infrastructure. Upstream collection programs allow access to very high volumes of data, and most of the pre-selection is done by the providers themselves, before the data is passed on to the NSA.

The FY 2013 budget for OAKSTAR was $9.41 million. OAKSTAR consists of the following SIGADs:

Designation	Covername	Legal Authority^{See Note}	Key Targets	Type of Information collected	Remarks
US-3206 (PDDG:6T)	MONKEYROCKET	Executive Order 12333	Counterterrorism in the Middle East, Europe, and Asia	DNI metadata and content	"Foreign access point," was expected to go online in spring 2012
US-3217 (PDDG:MU)	SHIFTINGSHADOW		Afghanistan communications: MTN Afghanistan, Roshan GSM Network, AWCC	DNR metadata and voice; "Timing Advances" and geolocation	"Foreign access point"
US-3230 (PDDG:0B)	ORANGECRUSH		"To be determined"	Voice, fax, DNI, DNR, and metadata	"Foreign access point through PRIMECANE, and 3rd party partner", not online as of the time of source presentation.
US-3247 (PDDG:PJ)	YACHTSHOP		Worldwide DNI Metadata	Worldwide DNI Metadata	"Access through BLUEANCHOR partner," contributor to MARINA
US-3251	ORANGEBLOSSOM				
US-3273 (PDDG:SK)	SILVERZEPHYR	Transit Authority and FAA	South, Central and Latin America	DNR Metadata, voice and fax; DNI content and metadata	"Network access point through STEELKNIGHT partner"
US-3277	BLUEZEPHYR				
US-3354	COBALTFALCON				

Note: SIGADs not otherwise designated are presumed to operate under the legal authority of Section 702 of the FISA Amendments Act (FAA)

== Glossary ==
- DNI: Digital Network Intelligence
- DNR: Dial Number Recognition
- MARINA: An NSA Database of Internet metadata
- Timing advances: no explanation has been provided in the source material.
- Transit Authority: A legal authority that states communications that transit the United States are collectible, provided that both endpoints are foreign.

== Media Relating to OAKSTAR and Upstream Collection ==
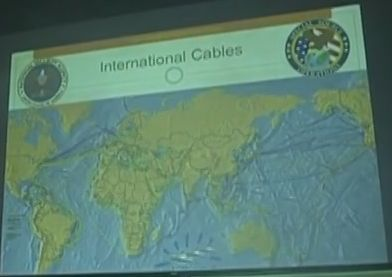
Upstream: Map of International Cables

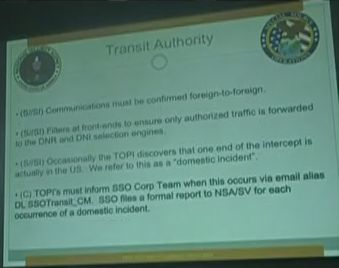
Upstream: Transit Authority

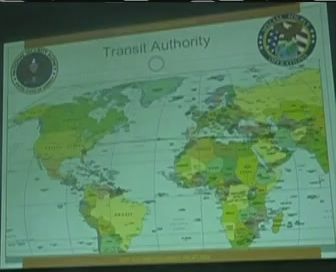
Upstream: Map of Transit Authority

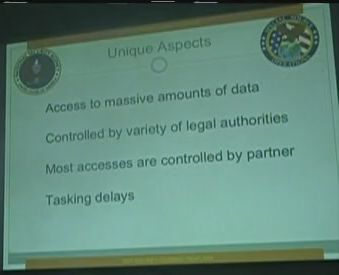
Upstream: Unique Aspects

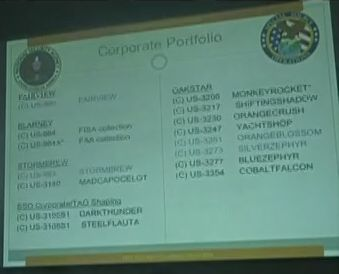
Upstream: Corporate Portfolio

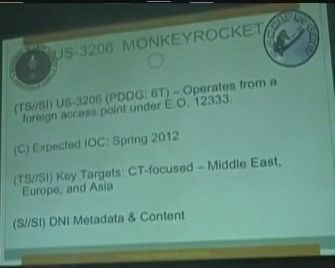
OAKSTAR: MONKEYROCKET SIGAD

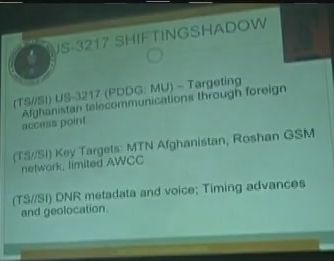
OAKSTSAR: SHIFTINGSHADOW SIGAD

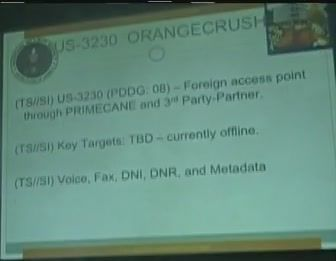
OAKSTAR: ORANGECRUSH SIGAD

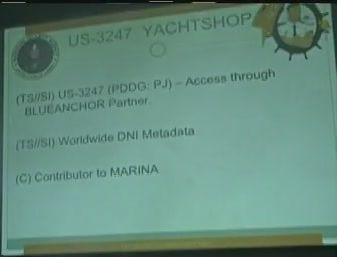
OAKSTAR: YACHTSHOP SIGAD

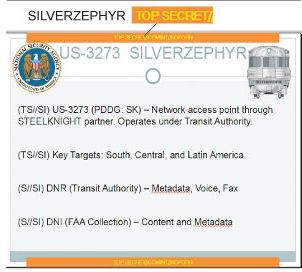
OAKSTAR:SILVERZEPHYR SIGAD
