= Pinwale =

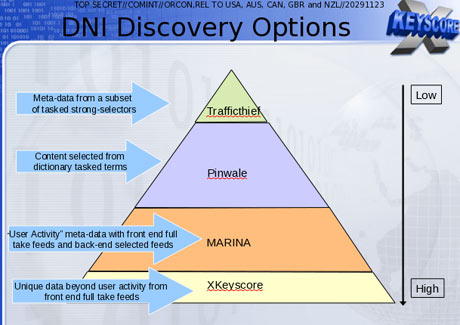
Reference to Pinwale in an XKeyscore slide

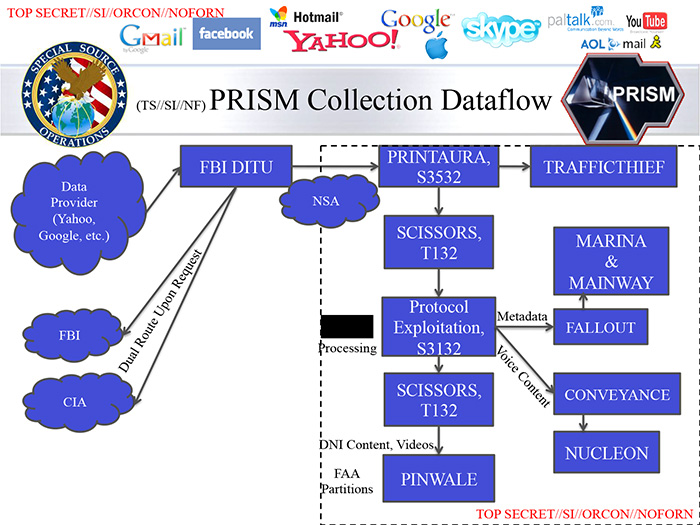
Reference to Pinwale in a PRISM slide

Pinwale is the code name for a National Security Agency (NSA) collection and retrieval system for so-called "Digital Network Intelligence", including internet e-mail. It is searchable by monitored NSA analysts.

The existence of the system was first revealed by an NSA analyst who was trained in its use during 2005. However, according to Homeland Security Today, Pinwale contains information much more than email. It also contains other forms of Internet data, and other forms of digital communications as well. Its software has built-in protections against collecting from any of the Five Eyes members. Unlike its successor XKeyscore, targets for Pinwale have to be approved beforehand by the FISC.

According to information obtained by The Guardian from Edward Snowden, Pinwale is part of a "multi-tiered system" to address the issue of NSA "collecting so much internet data that it can be stored only for short periods of time." The system allows analysts to store "interesting" content in databases such as Pinwale, which is capable of storing material for up to five years.

Pinwale consists of at least two known partitions referred to as "Sweet" and "Sour".

According to the documents leaked by Snowden, Pinwale normally processed about 60 GB data per day without trouble. However, Pinwale was overwhelmed when Yahoo started mass mailbox transfers between its data centers, which were captured by the NSA's MUSCULAR program that taps the private clouds of Google and Yahoo. Monitored email accounts being hacked by spammers also present a challenge to Pinwale, because they can cause the database of suspect email addresses to grow exponentially with information of no intelligence value.

== See also ==
- 2013 mass surveillance disclosures
- TURBULENCE
- PRISM
- XKeyscore
