= European Cloud Partnership =

Advisory group set up by the European Commission

The European Cloud Partnership (ECP) is an advisory group set up by the European Commission as part of the European Cloud Computing Strategy to provide guidance on the development of cloud computing in the European Union. The ECP is led by a steering board composed of representatives of the IT and telecom industry as well as European government policymakers.

== History ==
After publishing a document, "Unleashing the Potential of Cloud Computing in Europe", the European Commission set up the European Cloud Partnership in 2012, with a steering board including both government and industry representatives. The ECP's first meeting was held on 19 November 2012; it was chaired by the President of Estonia Toomas Hendrik Ilves.

In 2013 the ECP began drafting its charter. That year, as information about the PRISM scandal came to light, the ECP emphasized the need for Europe to develop its own cloud infrastructure, rather than depend on that of the United States. It completed a report titled "Trusted Cloud Europe" in February 2014 defining its policy, and outlining a process for effective public and private sector participation in cloud computing development in Europe. The report recommended that the commission identify technical, legal and operational best practices, and promote these through certifications and guidelines, and facilitate recognition across national boundaries. The report also recommended that the commission identify cloud computing stakeholders and help them work together through consultations and workshops.

In March 2014, the European Commission invited external parties to submit opinions, take part in a discussion forum and complete an online survey in response to the report.
