= Law Enforcement Information Exchange =

National Security Agency

The Law Enforcement Information Exchange is a database which is maintained by the Naval Criminal Investigative Service. Eugene R. Fidell described the database as constituting domestic spying.

According to the NCIS website,

The Naval Criminal Investigative Service (NCIS) launched the Law Enforcement Information Exchange (LInX) initiative in 2003. LInX is designed to enhance information sharing between local, state, and federal law enforcement in areas of strategic importance to the Department of the Navy. LInX provides participating law enforcement partner agencies with secure access to regional crime and incident data and the tools needed to process it, enabling investigators to search across jurisdictional boundaries to help solve crimes and resolve suspicious events. LInX is designed to facilitate cooperation and sharing. Ownership and control of the data remains with the agency that provided it.

== See also ==
- Law Enforcement Intelligence Unit
- Fusion center
- PRISM (surveillance program)
- TURBINE (US government project)
