= NIPC =

NIPC is an acronym for:

- National Infrastructure Protection Center
- National Inhalant Prevention Coalition
- National Insurance Professionals Corporation
- Nigeria Investment Promotion Commission
- Northeastern Illinois Planning Commission
