= Law Enforcement Intelligence Unit =

The Law Enforcement Intelligence Unit (LEIU) is an organization designed to facilitate intelligence sharing between state and local law enforcement agencies. It began in 1956 with 26 members and has since expanded to include roughly 250 members, mostly in the United States but also in Canada, Australia, and South Africa. The organization is divided into four zones: Eastern, Central, Northwestern, and Southwestern. According to its website, LEIU's purpose is to "gather, record, and exchange confidential information not available through regular police channels, concerning organized crime and terrorism."

Since the LEIU is not a government agency, it is not subject to the provisions of the U.S. Freedom of Information Act or its equivalents in other countries.

In June 2003, the annual meeting of the LEIU in Seattle, Washington was protested by approximately 400 people, resulting in 12 arrests, and pepper spraying of demonstrators. "Among the activists' concerns" were "post-9/11 laws such as the USA Patriot Act, which gives the government expanded powers to use wiretaps, electronic surveillance and other methods of information gathering."

== See also ==
- Fusion center
- Informant
- International Association of Law Enforcement Intelligence Analysts
- Law Enforcement Information Exchange
- Nationwide Suspicious Activity Reporting Initiative
- Political repression
- Red Squads
- Regional Information Sharing Systems
- Snitch
- Surveillance
- Surveillance abuse
