= Digitale Gesellschaft =

German registered association

Digitale Gesellschaft logo

Digitale Gesellschaft (literally, Digital Society) is a German registered association founded in 2010, that is committed to civil rights and consumer protection in terms of internet policy.

== History ==
The founding members of the association are Markus Beckedahl, Andreas Gebhard, Falk Steiner, Matthias Mehldau, Andre Meister, Markus Reuter, Benjamin von der Ahe, Rüdiger Weis, and John Weitzmann.

Benjamin Bergemann is a spokesman.

One of the aims of the interest group is to build a campaign infrastructure, and also to reach people who are not internet-savvy. Their founder, Beckedahl stated that "more effective advocacy toward politics and economy" is also a part of their mission.

As of May 2012, the group has approximately thirty members. According to Beckedahl, the small number of full members is necessary to build an infrastructure before opening up to more people.

== Issues ==
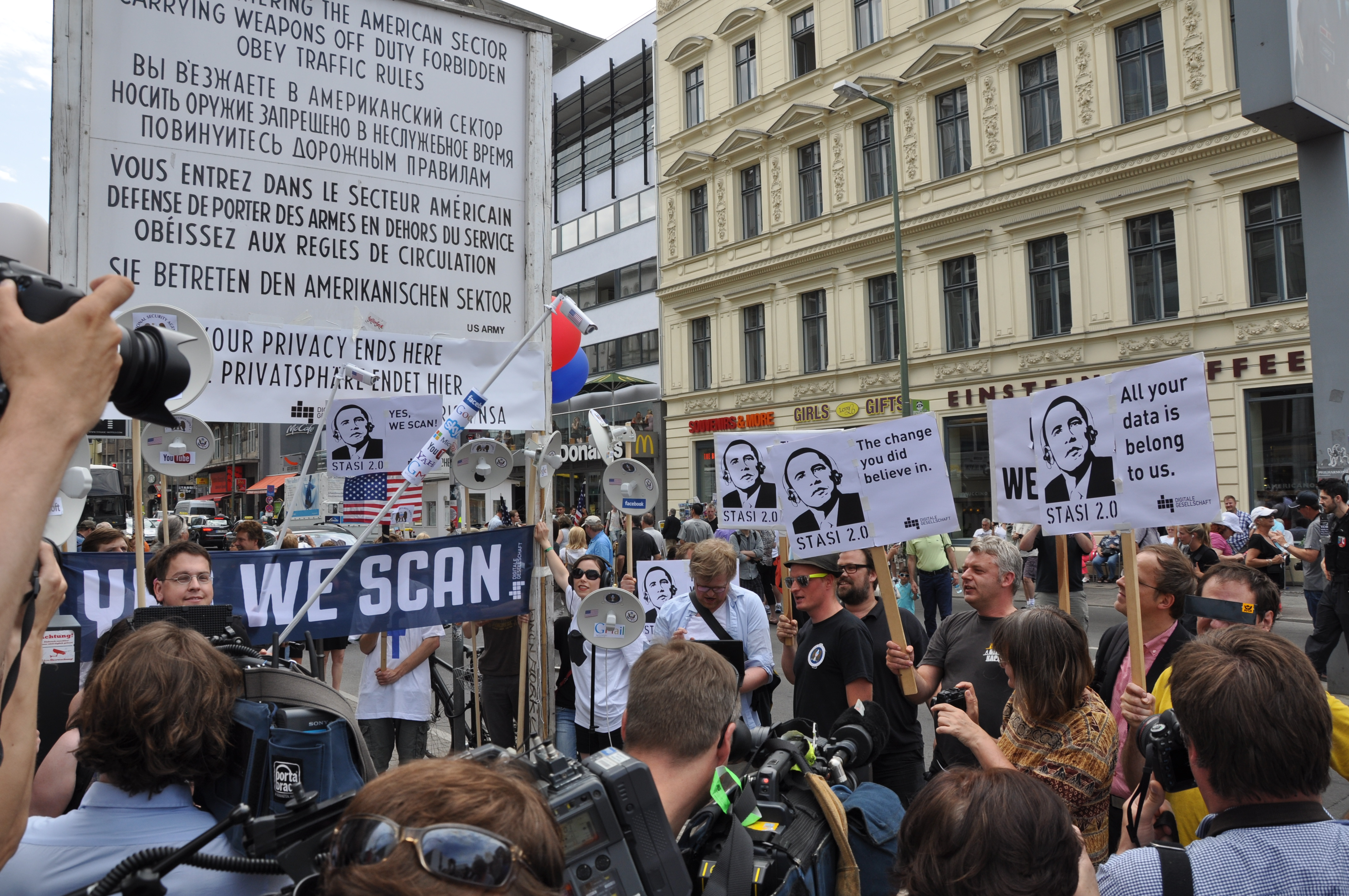
Digitale Gesellschaft protesting against PRISM at Checkpoint Charlie

The group has worked on topics such as ACTA, Open government, open data, information privacy, telecommunications data retention, copyright, and net neutrality.

In 2013, they led a demonstration at Checkpoint Charlie, during Barack Obama's visit, against the NSA surveillance program PRISM.
