= Operation TIPS =

2002 American planned domestic surveillance program

Operation TIPS, where the last part is an acronym for the Terrorism Information and Prevention System, was a domestic intelligence-gathering program designed by President George W. Bush to have United States citizens report suspicious activity. The program's website implied that US workers who had access to private citizens' homes, such as many cable installers and telephone repair workers, would be reporting on what was in people's homes if it were deemed "suspicious."

It came under intense scrutiny in July 2002 when the Washington Post alleged in an editorial that the program was vaguely defined, and investigative political journalist Ritt Goldstein observed in Australia's Sydney Morning Herald that TIPS would provide America with a higher percentage of 'citizen spies' than the former East Germany had under the notorious Stasi secret police. Goldstein later observed that he broke news of Operation TIPS on March 10 in Spain's second largest daily, El Mundo, but that he struggled until July before finding a major English language paper which would print the story.

In the days immediately following Goldstein's revelation, publications such as the libertarian magazine Reason, and then the Boston Globe, emphasized the Stasi analogy, widely highlighting Operation TIPS' shortcomings. TIPS was subsequently cancelled after concerns over civil liberties violations.

== Overview ==
The program's website implied that US workers who had access to private citizens' homes, such as cable installers and telephone repair workers, would be reporting on what was in people's homes if it were deemed "suspicious." The initial start of the program was to be August 2002 and would have included one million workers in ten US cities and then to be expanded.

Operation TIPS was accused of doing an "end run" around the United States Constitution, and the original wording of the website was subsequently changed. President Bush's then-Attorney General, John Ashcroft denied that private residences would be surveilled by private citizens operating as government spies. Mr. Ashcroft nonetheless defended the program, equivocating on whether the reports by citizens on fellow citizens would be maintained in government databases. While saying that the information would not be in a central database as part of Operation TIPS, he maintained that the information would still be kept in databases by various law enforcement agencies.

The databases were an explicit concern of various civil liberties groups (on both the left and the right) who felt that such databases could include false information about citizens with no way for those citizens to know that such information was compiled about them, nor any way for them to correct the information, nor any way for them to confront their accusers.

The United States Postal Service, after at first seeming supportive of the program, later resisted its personnel being included in this program, reasoning that if mail carriers became perceived as law enforcement personnel that they would be placed in danger at a level for which they could not reasonably be expected to be prepared, and that the downside of the program hence vastly outweighed any good that it could accomplish. The National Association of Letter Carriers, a postal labor union, was especially outspoken in its opposition.

== Attempted passage ==
Both Congressional Representative Dick Armey (Republican, Texas) and Senator Patrick Leahy (Democrat, Vermont) raised concerns. Senator Leahy said that it was similar to J. Edgar Hoover's misuse of the FBI during the 1960s when Hoover hired citizens to spy on neighbors who were political protesters. Rep. Armey included legislation in the House's Homeland Security Bill that explicitly prohibited the creation of Operation TIPS; but Joe Lieberman blocked the program's removal from the Senate version of the bill. The Senate, however, essentially passed the House version that eliminated the program.

Operation TIPS was officially cancelled when the Homeland Security Act was passed by Congress in November 2002. Section 880 explicitly prohibited the program.

== Terrorism Liaison Officers ==
On June 30, 2008, the Denver Post reported that 181 individuals, including police officers, paramedics, firefighters, utility workers, and railroad employees had been trained as Terrorism Liaison Officers to report suspicious information which could be signs of terrorist activity. The article also stated that TLOs were already active in six other states and the District of Columbia.

== See also ==
- Fusion center
- InfraGard
- Nationwide Suspicious Activity Reporting Initiative
