= Terrorism Liaison Officer =

A Terrorism Liaison Officer (TLO) is a public citizen in the United States of America who has been trained to report suspicious activity that may be encountered during the course of his or her normal occupation as part of the United States' war on terror. Although the TLO program was designed prior to September 11, 2001, the 9/11 attacks on the United States were a catalyst for the program's implementation. In 2002, the first pilot program for Terrorism Liaison Officers was launched in California. The program linked local law enforcement to the state's fusion centers and Office of Homeland Security. By 2008, hundreds of people had been trained and dispatched in multiple states, and by 2014, California alone had more than 14,000 TLOs. While some of these individuals are members of local law enforcement agencies, others such as paramedics, utility workers, and railroad employees have also been recruited into the program. TLOs have been used to monitor criminal activity associated with Occupy Wall Street and Black Lives Matter protests and activists.

== See also ==
- Fusion center
- InfraGard
- Operation TIPS
