= Fusion center =

U.S. government information groups

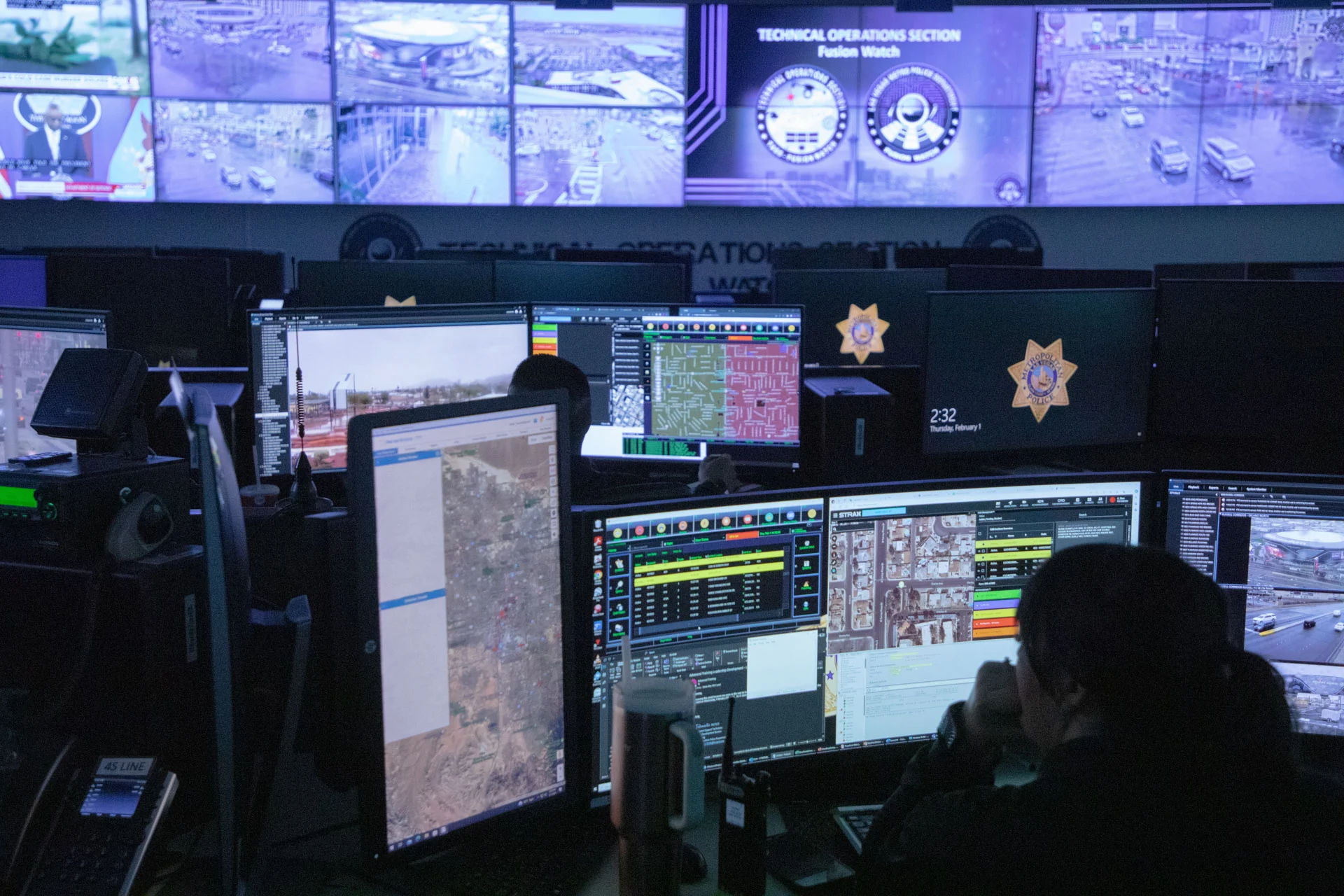
The Las Vegas Fusion Center during Super Bowl LVIII

In the United States, fusion centers are designed to promote information sharing at the federal level between agencies such as the Federal Bureau of Investigation, the U.S. Department of Homeland Security, the U.S. Department of Justice, and state, local, and tribal law enforcement. As of February 2018, the U.S. Department of Homeland Security recognized 79 fusion centers. Fusion centers may also be affiliated with an emergency operations center that responds in the event of a disaster.

The National Network of Fusion Centers was established after the September 11 attacks to allow collaboration across jurisdictions in order to respond to criminal and terrorist activity. It is a decentralized, distributed, self-organizing network of individual fusion centers and their respective partners within each center's area of responsibility. The process is a method of managing the flow of information and intelligence across levels and sectors of government to integrate information for analysis. Fusion centers rely on the active involvement of state, local, tribal, and federal law enforcement agencies—and sometimes on non–law enforcement agencies—to provide intelligence for their analysis. The intent is that, as the diversity of information sources increases, there will be more accurate and robust analysis that can be disseminated as intelligence.

The effectiveness of this strategy is disputed. Reports by the US House of Representatives Committee on Homeland Security have found fusion centers to be a national asset, though they have at times raised concerns about the ability to evaluate their effectiveness. A 2012 Senate report analyzed 13 months of fusion center reports and found no instances where they helped uncover or prevent a terror attack. The American Civil Liberties Union and the Department of Homeland Security have separately raised concerns about the threats fusion centers pose to privacy rights such as excessive secrecy, little oversight, and mission creep. The actions of individual fusion centers have also been criticized for actions such as labeling universities as terrorism threats, targeting third-party candidates and supporters as potential militia members, and incorrectly blaming a faulty water pump on Russian hackers.

== Operations ==
A fusion center is a collaborative effort between law enforcement agencies to share resources, expertise, and information in order to detect criminal and terrorist activity. The goal is to integrate the information each agency has together to prevent security gaps due to lack of communication. A fusion center is typically organized by combining representatives from different federal, state, local, and tribal law enforcement agencies into one physical location. Some fusion centers gather information not only from government sources, but also from their partners in the private sector. Each representative is intended to report information from their agency and use that agency-specific information to contribute to the collective analysis of the group. Similarly, the representative reports the analytic products and threat information back to their home agency.

State and local police departments provide both space and resources for the majority of fusion centers. The analysts working there can be drawn from a range of agencies and organizations, including DHS, FBI, Customs and Border Protection, Drug Enforcement Administration, Coast Guard, National Guard, Highway Patrol, state-level Departments of Corrections, local police, and the private sector. A number of fusion centers operate tip hotlines and also invite relevant information from public employees, such as sanitation workers or firefighters.

Fusion centers are often confused with investigative support centers or emergency operations centers. Investigative support centers, for example, respond to inquiries and requests from investigators, whereas fusion centers have the responsibility of proactively gathering intelligence, analyzing that information, and then disseminating it to their local, state and federal partners. Fusion centers are also constantly staffed, unlike emergency operations centers which are minimally staffed until a crisis.

== The National Fusion Center Association ==
The NFCA is an association that represents all of the fusion centers located across the country that make up the National Network. It is headed by an executive board composed of a president, vice president, executive director, treasurer, secretary, and two regional co-chairs that represent fusion centers from the North East, South East, Central, and West regions of the country. The mission of the NFCA is as follows:

"To represent the interests of state and major urban area fusion centers, as well as associated interests of states, tribal nations, and units of local government, in order to promote the development and sustainment of fusion centers to enhance public safety; encourage effective, efficient, ethical, lawful, and professional intelligence and information sharing; and prevent and reduce the harmful effects of crime and terrorism on victims, individuals, and communities."

Below are the overarching goals of the NFCA in their support of the National Network, and clearly define their existence as an association.

- Provide an independent and consolidated voice for state and major urban area fusion centers;
- Maintain the focus of state, tribal, local, and federal governments on the needs of the fusion centers;
- Represent fusion center concerns to the federal government through an education process;
- Provide support for the development of effective fusion center policy for the nation's state and local government elected officials and tribal leaders;
- Serve as a catalyst for the careful consideration and promotion of effective and efficient fusion center policies and practices;
- Advocate for the commitment of adequate resources to support a national, integrated network of state and major urban area fusion centers; and
- Coordinate between and among the different branches and levels of government and promote broad philosophical agreement.

The NFCA have their own website located at www.nfcausa.org, which contains contact information for each of the 79 fusion centers, a tool to submit a Suspicious Activity Report, and general news on the works of fusion centers across the country.

=== NFCA annual training event ===
The NFCA hosts an annual training event in Alexandria, Virginia.

=== History of the fusion center concept ===
The Fusion Center was originally called Terrorism Early Warning Group. It began in 1997. The author was a Los Angeles County Deputy Sheriff Sergeant John Sullivan. The concept was bring together law enforcement, LA County Health Services, and the Fire Service to acquire and share intelligence related to domestic and international terrorism. The TEWG expanded to include representatives from state and federal agencies who staffed and contributed and shared intelligence collected from their agencies. The TEWG eventually evolved into Fusion Centers throughout the nation. The fusion center concept was created as a result of the September 11 report, in an attempt by the Department of Homeland Security to create better communication and cooperation between state, local, and territorial law enforcement with federal law enforcement entities including the Federal Bureau of Investigation, the Department of Homeland Security and several others. With domestic and foreign threats constantly changing, the strategies used by each Fusion Center have to be defined, and altered, which calls for a specific plans and guidelines as to how to best protect the homeland. The National Strategy for Information Sharing and Safeguarding, as well as The National Strategy for Information Sharing are two documents that influenced the workings of the Fusion Center network, and defined a broad strategy for a more proactive information sharing network. The NFCA alongside several other federal and local law enforcement associations formulated the "Baseline Capabilities for State and Major Fusion Centers" as well as the "National Strategy for the National Network of Fusion Centers" are documents that defined a clear understanding of the role of Fusion Centers as well as time sensitive goals they should achieve. The National Strategy is constantly being developed as time passes to meet the needs of the changing environment of national security. Additionally, a "Cyber Appendix" was added to the Baseline Capabilities document, that defines the roles and operational capabilities of Fusion Centers to fight cyber crime that effects their areas of responsibility.

== Examples ==
=== Hurricane Irma ===
In 2017, Hurricane Irma hit several of the islands off the coast of the US, including the Virgin Islands. A couple from Falls Church, Virginia, had been trapped in their vacation home near St. John due to damage from the hurricane. They had no means to escape their island, no electricity, and a limited amount of water. After their daughter found a video that a pilot had taken from above the island, she noticed the landslide that had trapped her parents in their home. She reached out to congressmen, the Federal Emergency Management Agency, the Department of Defense, and the Red Cross, but the resources were not available to provide any assistance. The executive director of the National Fusion Center Association, Glenn Archer, was alerted of the family's situation, and reached out to the fusion center in the Virgin Islands, and after working through the night, the director of the Virgin Islands Fusion Center was able to locate the couple and deploy an FBI SWAT team to their location. The operation was successful, and the couple was able to return to Virginia and be reunited with their daughter. At the time of the rescue, the couple had been trapped for seven days, and had run out of potable water.

== Congressional reports ==
The United States Congress in its oversight capacity has issued multiple reports on fusion centers in the United States. The Senate Permanent Subcommittee on Investigations released a report in 2012 criticising the usefulness of fusion centers and practices. In a review of 13 months of fusion center reports, the Subcommittee found no examples of a fusion center uncovering a terrorist threat, and they criticized the use of reporting quotas for leading to a high rate of useless information being reported on by the centers. An example highlighted in the Senate report was a California fusion center report on the Mongols Motorcycle Club's distribution of leaflets to its members instructing them how to behave when stopped by police. According to the Senate report, the leaflet suggested to the Club members that they should be courteous, control their emotions and, if drinking, have a designated driver. One supervisor eventually killed the fusion center report, noting that "There is nothing illegal or even remotely objectionable [described] in this report," and that "The advice given to the groups' members is protected by the First Amendment."

The Senate report argued that the report quality was diminished by the DHS Office of Intelligence and Analysis imposing a quota on the number of reports that must be filed by the fusion centers. The report noted that of the 386 unclassified reports it reviewed, nearly 300 had no connection to terrorists or terrorism threats. The Senate committee estimated that as much as $1.4 billion had been spent on the fusion centers. Matthew Chandler, a spokesperson for the DHS, said that "In preparing the report, the committee refused to review relevant data, including important intelligence information pertinent to their findings," and that the "report fundamentally misunderstands the role of the federal government in supporting fusion centers and overlooks the significant benefits of this relationship to both state and local law enforcement and the federal government."

A 2013 report by the House Homeland Security committee reported on visits to 32 of the 78 fusion centers and 9 committee hearings. The Committee found that fusion centers were an asset, but needed improved federal assistance to reach their full potential. The lack of a State-focused, national strategy for fusion centers was highlighted as a major barrier to the effectiveness of fusion centers. The report notes that fusion centers do not universally focus on the implications of intelligence for national security, and while fusion centers should fulfill their State and local missions, they must do so in a way that requires analysis with an eye towards counterterrorism. The Committee takes issue with the previous performance metrics which focused on quantity rather than quality of reports, and this inability to assess the quality of reports makes evaluating the value of fusion centers difficult. They point out that the uncertainty of annual budgets due to the funding structure makes long term planning difficult.

A 2017 report by the House Homeland Security committee reported on interviews with staff from 15 fusion centers and 68 responses to its survey of the 78 fusion centers. The report highlight the growth of fusion center operations since its previous 2013 report and highlighted particular challenges which threaten to reduce the effectiveness of fusion centers. The report highlighted the expanded efforts to include emergency personnel such as fire department and emergency medical services. Respondents to the survey raised concerns about their centers' limited access to unclassified and classified information, and the Committee critiqued the level of technical support offered to fusion centers in order to handle cyber threats. The report took issue with the recent decisions of social media companies to restrict access to their data by fusion centers.

== NATO Intelligence Fusion Centre ==
In Molesworth (Cambridgeshire, United Kingdom), near Milton Keynes, NATO has operated the NATO Intelligence Fusion Centre (NIFC) since 2006. This centre was originally planned by Allied Command Transformation as a NATO coordination centre for the War on Terror.

Little is known about the participants or information providers at the NIFC. Not even all NATO members provide information as a matter of course. For example, Albania only joined the Center in 2010. Furthermore, it includes non-NATO members, i.e., "close allies," such as:

- Australia
- South Africa

Furthermore, the following bodies are mentioned:

- the National Military Command Center of the Pentagon
- the Emergency Conference Room (also in the Pentagon)
- the National Counterterrorism Center

The way it functions is not publicly discussed, and little is known about it. Its activities are divided into command, data analysis, an operational, and a support department. It is presumed to operate in four shifts. The NIFC provides all-source strategic and tactical theater intelligence compiled from various sources in response to requests for information from US or NATO command posts. It also identifies gaps in information and provides recommendations for improving information processing. The NIFC also supports the electronic battlefield of cyber defense and attack with planning data and technical expertise, also known by the acronym C^{4} ISTAR (a combination of C^{4} = Command, Control, Communications, Computers and ISTAR = Intelligence, Surveillance, Target, Acquisition, and Reconnaissance).

In 2007, it was proposed to transform the NIFC into a joint NATO/EU fusion center.

== Concerns ==
There are a number of documented concerns about fusion centers, including relative ineffectiveness at counterterrorism activities, the potential to be used for secondary purposes unrelated to counterterrorism, and their links to violations of civil liberties of American citizens and others. One such fusion center has been involved with spying on anti-war and peace activists as well as anarchists in Washington state.

David Rittgers of the Cato Institute has noted:

a long line of fusion center and DHS reports labeling broad swaths of the public as a threat to national security. The North Texas Fusion System labeled Muslim lobbyists as a potential threat; a DHS analyst in Wisconsin thought both pro- and anti-abortion activists were worrisome; a Pennsylvania homeland security contractor watched environmental activists, Tea Party groups, and a Second Amendment rally; the Maryland State Police put anti-death penalty and anti-war activists in a federal terrorism database; a fusion center in Missouri thought that all third-party voters and Ron Paul supporters were a threat; and the Department of Homeland Security described half of the American political spectrum as "right wing extremists."

A 2007 ACLU report raised concerns with four areas of fusion center aspects, the first of which was that they suffered from "ambiguous lines of authority", meaning that the fusion process "allows the authorities to manipulate differences in federal, state and local laws to maximize information collection while evading accountability and oversight through the practice of 'policy shopping'." The ACLU was also concerned with the private sector and military participation in the surveillance of US citizens through these fusion centers. Finally, the ACLU report argued that fusion centers were likely to engage in poorly contained data mining because the "Federal fusion center guidelines encourage whole sale data collection and manipulation processes that threaten privacy" and that the centers were "hobbled by excessive secrecy". An updated ACLU report in 2008 argued that the fusion centers were creating a "total surveillance society" in the US. An ACLU spokesperson compared the fusion centers initiative with Operation TIPS because of the involvement of private Terrorism Liaison Officers.

=== MIAC report ===
Missouri Information Analysis Center (MIAC) made news in 2009 for targeting supporters of third party candidates, Ron Paul supporters, anti-abortion activists, and conspiracy theorists as potential militia members. Anti-war activists and Islamic lobby groups were targeted in Texas, drawing criticism from the ACLU.

According to the Department of Homeland Security:

[T]he Privacy Office has identified a number of risks to privacy presented by the fusion center program:

1. Justification for fusion centers
2. Ambiguous Lines of Authority, Rules, and Oversight
3. Participation of the Military and the Private Sector
4. Data Mining
5. Excessive Secrecy
6. Inaccurate or incomplete information
7. Mission Creep

=== 2009 Virginia terrorism threat assessment ===
In early April 2009, the Virginia Fusion Center came under criticism for publishing a terrorism threat assessment which stated that certain universities are potential hubs for terror related activity. The report targeted historically black colleges and identified hacktivism as a form of terrorism.

=== 2011 Illinois fusion center finds water pump was "hacked"; the FBI disagrees ===
A November 2011 report by the Illinois fusion center was criticized for alleging that Russia hacked and deliberately disabled a water pump of the municipal water system in Illinois. The Senate report writes: "Apparently aware of how important such an event could have been had it been real, DHS intelligence officials included the false allegations—stated as fact—in a daily intelligence briefing that went to Congress and the intelligence community." A subsequent FBI investigation found however that: "The only fact that they got right was that a water pump in a small Illinois water district had burned out."

=== Washington State Fusion Center ===
A lawsuit alleges that a Washington State Fusion Center employee added members of the Port Militarization Resistance to the domestic terrorists list on unsubstantiated grounds.

=== Environmentalists ===
A center in Oregon was reported to have supported a task force monitoring protest groups organizing against fossil fuel projects.

=== Black Lives Matters protests ===
The centers have been alleged to have monitored Black Lives Matter protests.

=== Circumventing sanctuary city laws ===
The centers have been criticized for enabling the circumvention of sanctuary city laws.

=== 2020s Palestine protests ===
"The Intercept has found that fusion centers were actively involved in monitoring pro-Palestine demonstrations on at least five campuses across the country, as shown in more than 20,000 pages of documents obtained via public records requests".

== See also ==
- BlueLeaks
- ADVISE
- COINTELPRO
- Council of Governors
- Implementing Recommendations of the 9/11 Commission Act of 2007
- Investigative Data Warehouse
- Laird v. Tatum
- Law Enforcement Intelligence Unit
- Nationwide Suspicious Activity Reporting Initiative
- Open-source intelligence
- PRISM (surveillance program)
- Public-private partnerships in the United States
- Surveillance
- TALON (database)
- Terrorism Liaison Officer
- Total Information Awareness
- USA PATRIOT Act
