= National Infrastructure Protection Center =

Outgrowth of DOJ-FBI Infrastructure Protection Partnership

The National Infrastructure Protection Center (NIPC) was a unit of the United States federal government charged with protecting computer systems and information systems critical to the United States' infrastructure. It was founded in 1998 by President Bill Clinton's Presidential Decision Directive 63. It was originally created as a branch of the FBI.

In 2003, the NIPC was transferred to the Department of Homeland Security. The NIPC was eventually (2002) disbanded, with other federal government organizations taking on its responsibilities. [Homeland Security Act (P.L. 107-296)]

== See also ==
- InfraGard
