= List of government mass surveillance projects =

This is a list of government surveillance projects and related databases throughout the world.

== International ==
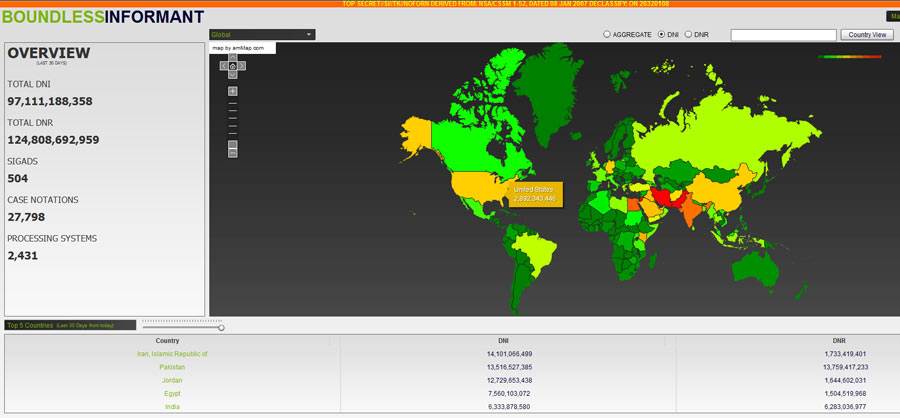
Snapshot of Boundless Informant's global map of data collection

- ECHELON: A signals intelligence (SIGINT) collection and analysis network operated on behalf of the five signatory states to the UKUSA Security Agreement.

=== European Union ===
==== Former ====
- Data Retention Directive: A defunct directive requiring EU member states to store citizens' telecommunications data for six to 24 months and allowing police and security agencies to request access from a court to details such as IP address and time of use of every email, phone call, and text message sent or received.
- INDECT: Was a research project (until 2014) funded by the European Union to develop surveillance methods (e.g. processing of CCTV camera data streams) for the monitoring of abnormal behaviours in an urban environment.

==== Current (as per 2024) ====
- Schengen Information System: A database kept for national security and law enforcement purposes.

== National ==
=== Australia ===
- In August 2014 it was reported that law-enforcement agencies had been accessing Australians' web browsing histories via internet providers such as Telstra without a warrant.
- It was reported that Australia had issued 75% more wiretap warrants in 2003 than the US did and this was 26 times greater than the US on a per capita basis.

=== Canada ===
The Liberal party of Canada collects intrusive data of constituents that include private personal information such as a person`s religion. The collection practice came to light when Liberal MP Rachel Bendayan sent Ramadan Calendars to Muslim constituents.

=== China ===
- Golden Shield Project: Also known as the "Great Firewall of China", it is a censorship and surveillance project operated by the Ministry of Public Security (MPS) division of the government of the People's Republic of China. The project was initiated in 1998 and began operations in November 2003.
- The Integrated Joint Operations Platform (IJOP, 一体化联合作战平台) is used by the government to monitor the population, particularly Uyghurs. The platform gathers biometrics, including DNA samples, to track individuals in Xinjiang.
- Monitoring Bureau
- Public Information Network Security
- Social Credit System

=== France ===
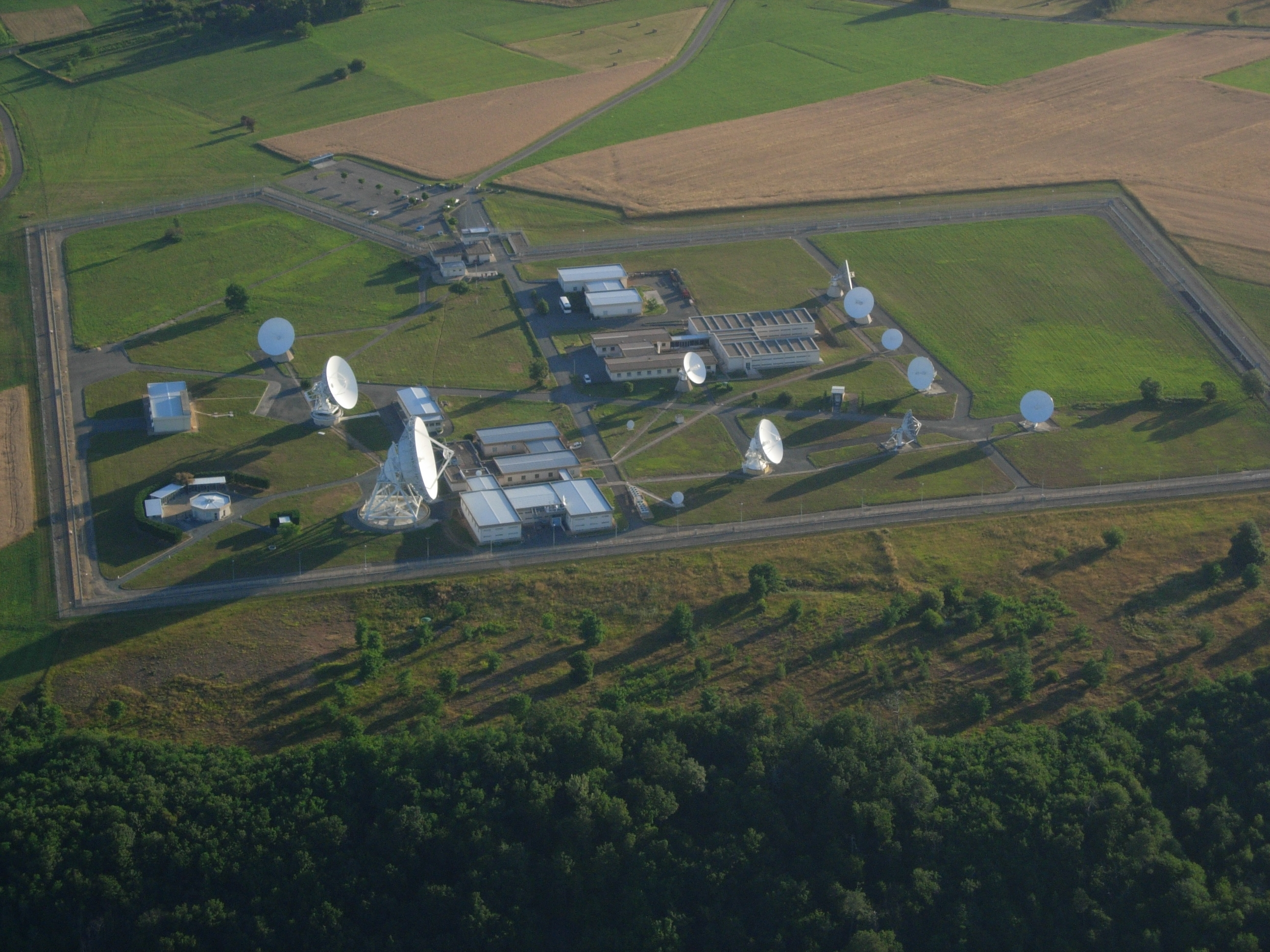
DGSE base near Domme in southwestern France

- Frenchelon: A data collection and analysis network operated by the French Directorate-General for External Security.

=== Germany ===
- Nachrichtendienstliches Informationssystem: a searchable database operated by the German security agency Bundesamt für Verfassungsschutz (BfV).
- Project 6: a global surveillance project jointly operated by the German intelligence agencies Bundesnachrichtendienst (BND) and Bundesamt für Verfassungsschutz (BfV) in close cooperation with the U.S. Central Intelligence Agency (CIA).

=== India ===
- Central Monitoring System (CMS): A data collection system similar to the NSA's PRISM program. It enables the Government of India to listen to phone conversations, intercept e-mails and text messages, monitor posts on social networking service and track searches on Google.
- DRDO NETRA: Network that is capable of tracking online communications on a real time basis by harvesting data from various voice-over-IP services, including Skype and Google Talk. It is operated by the Research and Analysis Wing.
- NATGRID: An intelligence grid that links the databases of several departments and ministries of the Government of India.

=== Russia ===
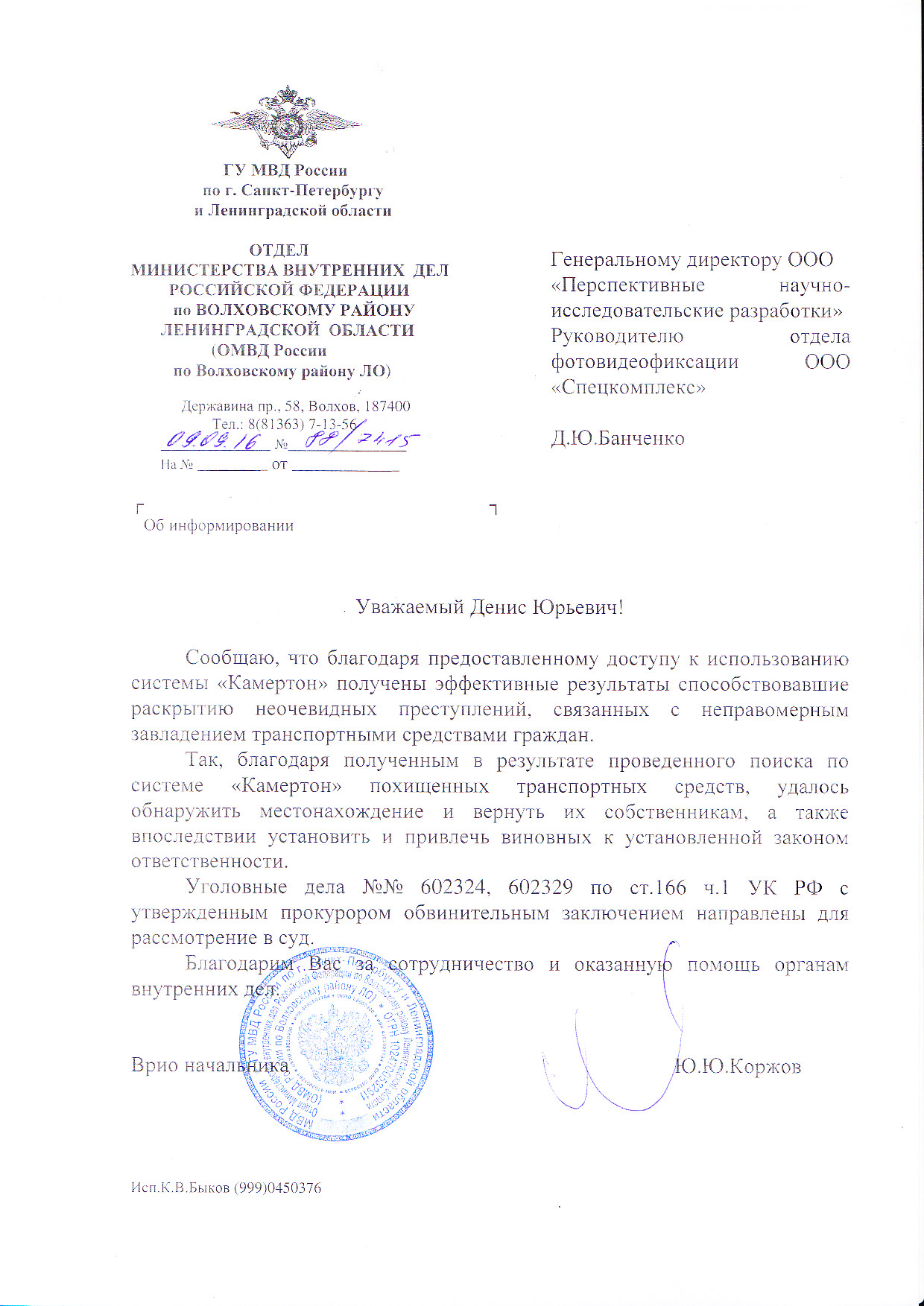
- Gratitude of the Department of the Ministry of Internal Affairs of the Russian Federation for the Volkhov region of the organization Perspective Scientific Research Development for the creation of the "CAMERTON" system.
  SORM: A technical system used by the Federal Security Service of the Russian Federation to monitor internet and telephone communication.
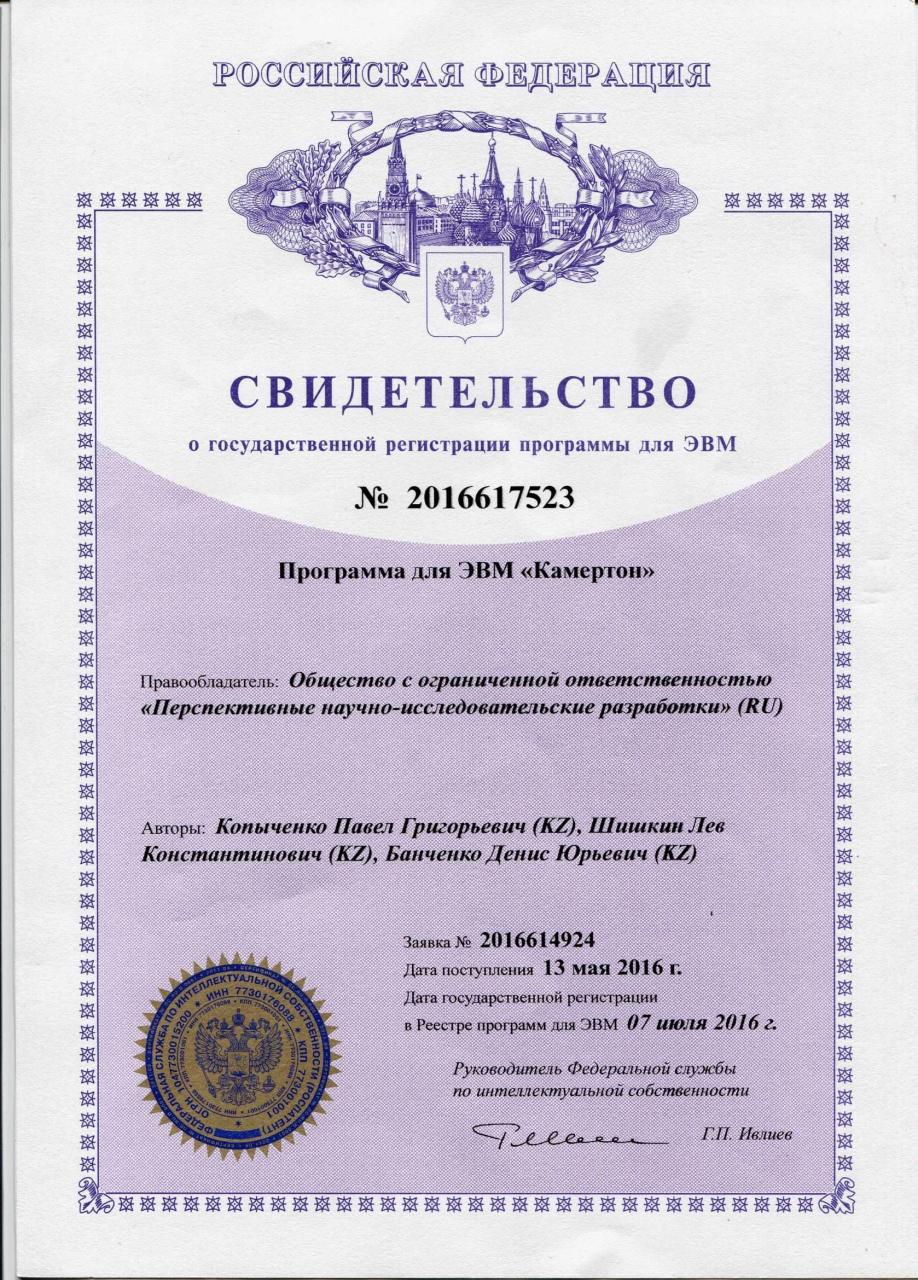
- Certificate of state registration of the "monitoring, control, tracking the target of ground vehicles" - "СAMERTON".
  СAMERTON: Is a global vehicle tracking system, control and tracking, identification of probable routes and places of the most frequent appearance of a particular vehicle, integrated with a distributed network of radar complexes of photo-video fixation and road surveillance camera. Developed and implemented by the "Advanced Scientific - Research Projects" enterprise St. Petersburg. Within the framework of the practical use of the system of the Ministry of Internal Affairs of the Russian Federation, it has made it possible to identify and solve grave and especially grave crimes, the system is also operated by other state services and departments;
- Yarovaya Law is a piece of anti-terrorist legislation that includes a requirement to store all phone call and text messaging data, as well as providing cryptographic backdoors for security services.

=== Sweden ===
- Titan traffic database: A database established by the Swedish National Defence Radio Establishment (Swedish: Försvarets radioanstalt, FRA) where call detail records (CDRs) of telephony and internet traffic and transaction data (IPDRs) concerning international telecommunications are stored.
- X-Keyscore: A system used by the United States National Security Agency for searching and analysing internet data about foreign nationals. FRA has been granted access to the program.

=== Switzerland ===
- Onyx: A data gathering system maintained by several Swiss intelligence agencies to monitor military and civilian communications, such as e-mails, telefax and telephone calls. In 2001, Onyx received its second nomination from the ironically named "Big Brother Award".

=== United Kingdom ===
- Impact Nominal Index: The Impact Nominal Index or INI is a computer system that enables the UK police force to establish whether other relevant authorities are holding information regarding a person of interest.
- Interception Modernisation Programme: An initiative to extend the UK government's capability to lawfully intercept and store communications data in a central database.
- Mastering the Internet (MTI): A clandestine mass surveillance program led by the British intelligence agency GCHQ. Data gathered by the GCHQ include the contents of email messages, entries on the social networking platform Facebook and the web browsing history of internet users.
- UK National DNA Database (NDNAD): It is also the oldest national DNA database in the world. Since its establishment in 1995, the database has grown to include DNA samples from 2.7 million individuals, or 5.2% of the UK's population, many of whom have neither been charged with, or convicted of, any offence.
- Tempora: Launched in the autumn of 2011, this initiative allows the GCHQ to set up a large-scale buffer that is capable of storing internet content for 3 days and metadata for 30 days.
- Royal Concierge: prototyped in 2010, sends daily alerts to GCHQ whenever a booking is made from a ".gov." second-level domain at select hotels worldwide.
- Collection of Internet Connection Records, being trialled in the UK as of March 2021.

=== United States ===
A top secret document leaked by Edward Snowden to The Guardian in 2013, originally due to be declassified on 12 April 2038.

- Boundless Informant: A system deployed by the National Security Agency to analyze global electronic information. In March 2013, Boundless Informant gathered 14 billion data reports from Iran, 6.3 billion from India, and 2.8 billion from the United States.
- BULLRUN: a highly classified U.S. National Security Agency program to preserve its ability to eavesdrop on encrypted communications by influencing and weakening encryption standards, by obtaining master encryption keys, and by gaining access to data before or after it is encrypted either by agreement, by force of law, or by computer network exploitation (hacking).
- Carnivore: A system implemented by the Federal Bureau of Investigation that was designed to monitor email and electronic communications. Apparently replaced by commercial software such as NarusInsight.
- Comprehensive National Cybersecurity Initiative
- DCSNet: The Federal Bureau of Investigation (FBI)'s point-and-click surveillance system that can perform instant wiretaps on any telecommunications device located in the United States.
- Fairview: A mass surveillance program directed at foreign mobile phone users.
- Financial Crimes Enforcement Network: A bureau of the Department of the Treasury that collects and analyzes financial transactions in order to combat financial crimes.
- ICREACH: Surveillance frontend GUI that is shared with 23 government agencies, including the CIA, DEA, and FBI, to search illegally collected personal records.
- Magic Lantern: A keystroke logging software deployed by the FBI in the form of an e-mail attachment. When activated, it acts as a trojan horse and allows the FBI to decrypt user communications.
- Main Core: A personal and financial database storing information of millions of U.S. citizens believed to be threats to national security. The data mostly comes from the NSA, FBI, CIA, as well as other government sources.
- MAINWAY: NSA database containing metadata for hundreds of billions of telephone calls made through the four largest telephone carriers in the United States.
- Media monitoring services, A proposed DHS database for monitoring all global news sources and media influencers.
- MUSCULAR: Overseas wiretapping of Google's and Yahoo's unencrypted internal networks by the NSA.
- MYSTIC is a voice interception program used by the National Security Agency.
- Nationwide Suspicious Activity Reporting Initiative: Under this government initiative, a Suspicious Activity Report (SAR) may be filed by law enforcers, public safety personnel, owners of critical infrastructure or the general public.
- NSA ANT catalog: a 50-page document listing technology available to the United States National Security Agency (NSA) ANT division to aid in cyber-surveillance.
- PRISM: A clandestine national security electronic surveillance program operated by the United States National Security Agency (NSA) which can target customers of participating corporations outside or inside the United States.
- Room 641A: A telecommunication interception facility operated by AT&T for the U.S. National Security Agency.
- Sentry Eagle: efforts to monitor and attack an adversary's cyberspace through capabilities include SIGINT, Computer Network Exploitation (CNE), Information Assurance, Computer Network Defense (CND), Network Warfare, and Computer Network Attack (CNA). The efforts included weakening US commercial encryption systems.
- Special Collection Service (SCS): A black budget program that is responsible for "close surveillance, burglary, wiretapping, breaking and entering." It employs covert listening device technologies to bug foreign embassies, communications centers, computer facilities, fiber-optic networks, and government installations.
- Stellar Wind (code name): The open secret code name for four surveillance programs.
- Tailored Access Operations: Intelligence-gathering unit of the NSA that is capable of harvesting approximately 2 petabytes of data per hour.
- Terrorist Finance Tracking Program: A joint initiative run by the CIA and the Department of the Treasury to access the SWIFT (Society for Worldwide Interbank Financial Telecommunication) transaction database as part of the Bush administration's "Global War on Terrorism". According to the U.S. government, its efforts to counter terrorist activities were compromised after the existence of the Terrorist Finance Tracking Program was leaked to the media.
- Turbulence (NSA): Turbulence is a United States National Security Agency (NSA) information-technology project started circa 2005. It was developed in small, inexpensive "test" pieces rather than one grand plan like its failed predecessor, the Trailblazer Project. It also includes offensive cyberwarfare capabilities, like injecting malware into remote computers. The U.S. Congress criticized the project in 2007 for having similar bureaucratic problems as the Trailblazer Project.
- US Intelligence Community (IC): A cooperative federation of 16 government agencies working together, but also separately, to gather intelligence and conduct espionage.
- Utah Data Center: The Intelligence Community's US$1.5 billion data storage center that is designed to store extremely large amounts of data, on the scale of yottabytes.
- X-Keyscore: A system used by the United States National Security Agency for searching and analysing internet data about foreign nationals.

== Unclear origin ==
- GhostNet: A fictitious code name given to a large-scale surveillance project that is believed to be operated by the People's Republic of China.
- Stuxnet: It is the first discovered malware that spies on industrial systems, and it was used to attack Iran's nuclear facilities. It is believed to have originated from the United States under the Bush administration.

== Recently discontinued ==
- Information Awareness Office: An office established to bring together several DARPA projects focused on applying surveillance and information technology to track and monitor terrorists and other threats to U.S. national security.
- Multistate Anti-Terrorism Information Exchange (MATRIX): A data mining system originally developed for the Florida Department of Law Enforcement.
- Terrorist Surveillance Program: Replaced by PRISM.
- ThinThread: A U.S. National Security Agency (NSA) program that involved wiretapping and sophisticated analysis of the resulting data.
- Trailblazer Project: U.S. National Security Agency (NSA) program intended to develop a capability to analyze data carried on communications networks including cell phone networks and the Internet.

== See also ==
- 2013 Public disclosures of surveillance and espionage activities
- Electronic police state
- List of public disclosures of classified information
- NSA warrantless surveillance (2001–07)
- Politico-media complex
