= Pasdar =

Pasdar (Persian: پاسدار) may refer to:

- Pasdar (IRGC), a title for members of the Islamic Revolutionary Guard Corps
- Adrian Pasdar (born 1965), American actor
- Babak Pasdar, Iranian-American cyber security author
