= Sentry Eagle =

Sentry Eagle, the National Initiative Protection Program, is a compartmented program of the National Security Agency's (NSA) Central Security Service (CSS) and the US Strategic Command Joint Functional Component Command - Network Warfare (JFCC-NW). Its existence was revealed during the 2013 global surveillance disclosure by Edward Snowden.

The program's efforts to protect America's cyberspace includes efforts to plan, synchronize, and attack an adversary's cyberspace through Computer Network Attack (CNA). The combination of those efforts are referred to as NSA/CSS's and JFCC-NW's core Computer Network Operations (CNO).

The CNO capabilities include SIGINT, Computer Network Exploitation (CNE), Information Assurance, Computer Network Defense (CND), Network Warfare, and Computer Network Attack (CNA).

Sentry Eagle includes six sub-programs:

- Sentry Hawk (for activities involving computer network exploitation, or spying)
- Sentry Falcon (computer network defense)
- Sentry Osprey (cooperation with the CIA and other intelligence agencies)
- Sentry Raven (breaking encryption systems)
- Sentry Condor (computer network operations and attacks)
- Sentry Owl (collaborations with private companies)

== Sentry Hawk ==
The Sentry Hawk program is a computer network exploitation program involving the CIA and FBI. The program attempts to exploit computers, computer peripherals, computer-controlled devices, computer networks or facilities housing them, and publicly accessible computing and networking infrastructure. Targets include specific firewalls, operating systems, and software applications. The program operates with the benefit of partnerships with US commercial sector companies.

== Sentry Falcon ==
The Sentry Falcon program is a computer network defense program focused on attack attribution.

== Sentry Osprey ==
The Sentry Osprey program is a collaborative program with the CIA and the National Clandestine Service (NCS), FBI, and the Defense Clandestine Service of the Defense Intelligence Agency to perform Target Exploitation (TAREX) of foreign communication infrastructure.

== Sentry Raven ==
The Sentry Raven program involves secret efforts to weaken commercial encryption systems and software in order to make them exploitable for SIGINT. The cryptosystems targeted include systems used by the US private sector and developed by US companies.

Sentry Raven involves the use of super computers and special purpose cryptanalytic hardware and software to break foreign ciphers. It also involves the spending of hundreds of millions of dollars on special purpose computer systems to attack US commercial encryption systems, including the exploitation of weaknesses places in them by cooperating companies or undercover agents within US companies.

== Sentry Condor ==
The Sentry Condor program involves the provision of cyber target identification and recognition material and tools and techniques that allow computer network attack on those targets.

== Sentry Owl ==
The Sentry Owl program involves the use of US industry personnel, or undercover NSA personnel at US and foreign employers, to enable SIGINT operations on US and foreign commercial communications products. The program includes contracts with US and foreign commercial entities to subvert the privacy features of their products for both foreign and domestic consumers (for both content and metadata).

== See also ==
- List of government surveillance projects
- Mass surveillance
- Signals intelligence
