= Project 6 =

Project 6, or simply P6, is a global surveillance project jointly operated by the U.S.'s Central Intelligence Agency (CIA) in close cooperation with the German intelligence agencies Bundesnachrichtendienst (BND) and Bundesamt für Verfassungsschutz (BfV). Nominally a result of efforts to combat terrorism, the project includes a massive database containing personal information such as photos, license plate numbers, Internet search histories and telephone metadata of presumed jihadists. The headquarters of the project is located in Neuss, Germany.

== See also ==
- List of government surveillance projects
- Nachrichtendienstliches Informationssystem
