= DHS media monitoring services =

DHS media monitoring services is a proposed United States Department of Homeland Security database to keep track of 290,000 global news sources and media influencers to monitor sentiment.

Privacy and free speech advocates have criticized the project's far-reaching scope, likening it to a panopticon. The DHS has replied that "Despite what some reporters may suggest, this is nothing more than the standard practice of monitoring current events in the media. Any suggestion otherwise is fit for tin foil hat wearing, black helicopter conspiracy theorists." It will also look at trade and industry publications, local, national and international outlets, and social media, according to documents. The plans also encompass media coverage being tracked in more than 100 languages including Arabic, Chinese, and Russian, with instant translation of articles into English. The DHS Media Monitoring plan would allow for "24/7 access to a password protected, media influencer database, including journalist, editors, correspondents, social media influencers, bloggers etc" to identify "any and all media coverage related to the Department of Homeland Security or a particular event."

The DHS has noted that agencies under its purview already operate similar databases. Several news organizations have noted that similar services, though narrower in scope, already exist and the proposed DHS service would be the norm within the news industry.

Several organizations have come out opposing the creation of the service: Occupy movement and Reporters Committee for Freedom of the Press.

== History ==
Beginning in January 2010, the NOC launched Media Monitoring Capability (MMC) pilots using social media monitoring related to specific mission-related incidents and international events. These pilots were conducted to help fulfill the NOC's statutory responsibility to provide situational awareness and to access potentially valuable public information within the social media realm. Prior to implementation of each social media pilot, the DHS Privacy Office and OPS developed detailed standards and procedures for reviewing information on social media web sites.

In February 2012, the House of Representatives held a hearing with concerns to counter cyber-terrorism, as well as other acts of criminal activity, whilst maintaining the privacy rights of Americans. The DHS was discussed on its methodology and usage of social media services. In one example, DHS used multiple social networking blogs, including Facebook and Twitter, three different blogs, and reader comments in newspapers to capture the reaction of residents to a possible plan to bring Guantanamo detainees to a local prison in Standish, Michigan.
