= CAMERTON =

Russian global vehicle tracking system

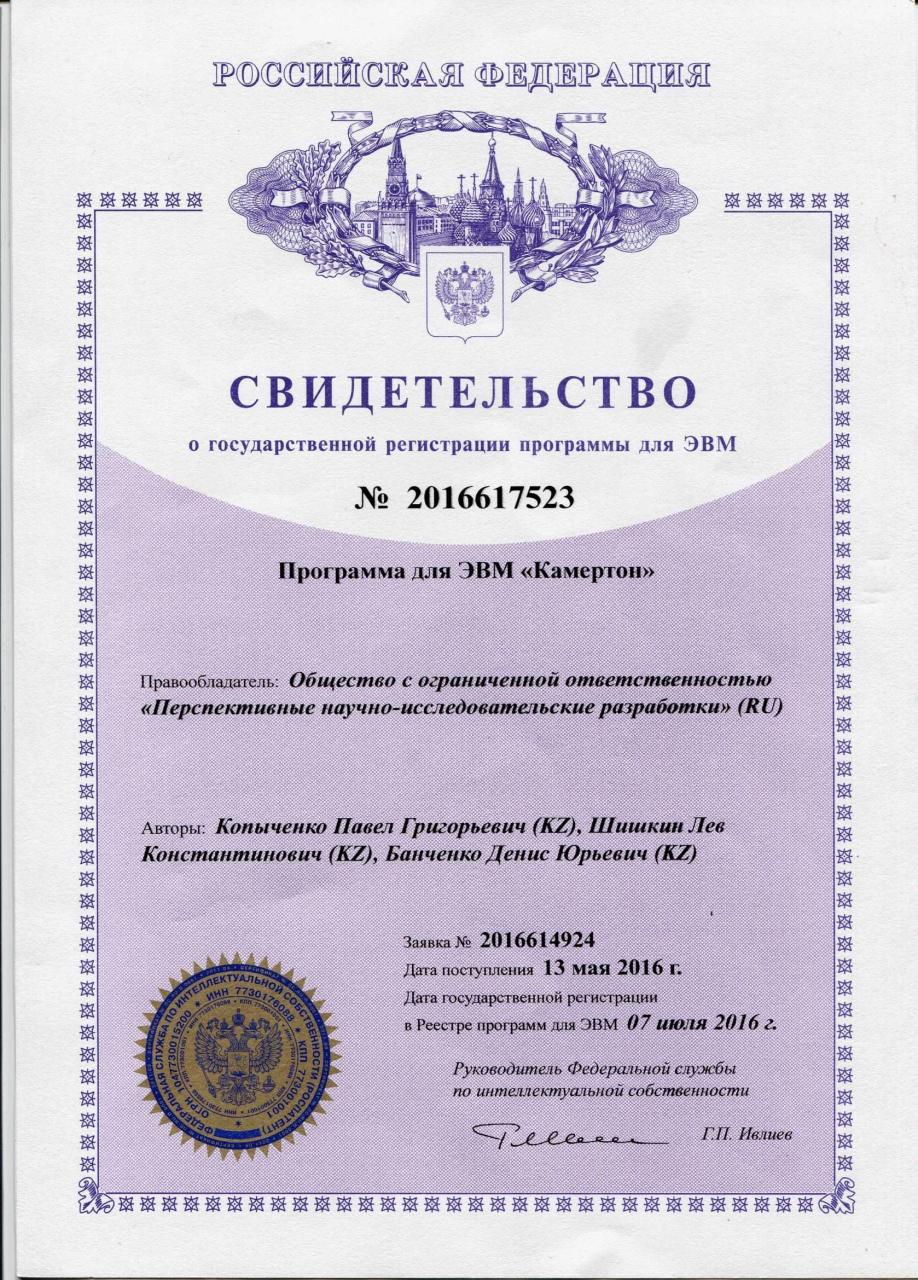
Certificate of state registration of the "monitoring, control, tracking the target of ground vehicles" - "CAMERTON".

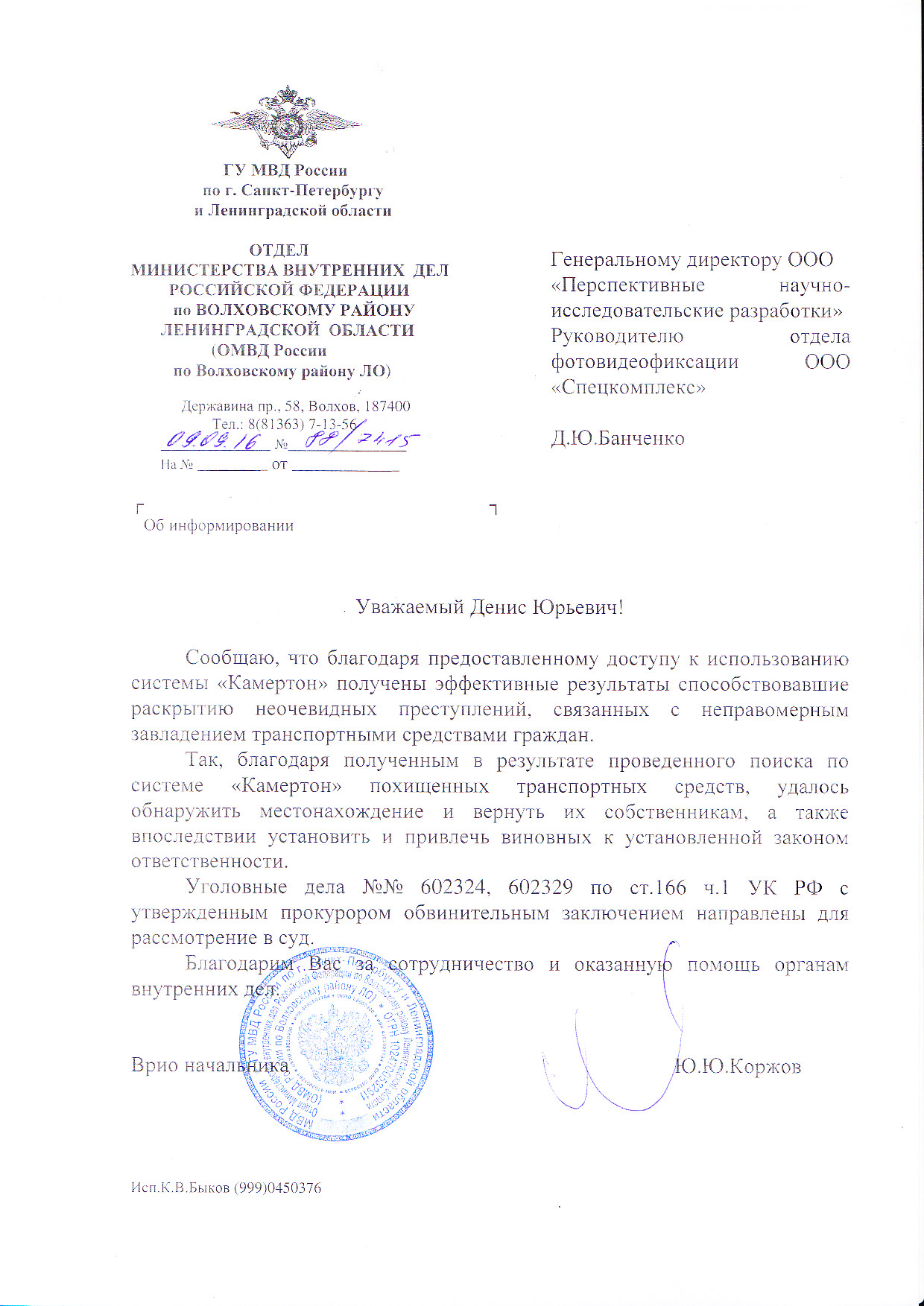
Gratitude of the Department of the Ministry of Internal Affairs of the Russian Federation for the Volkhov region of the organization Perspective Scientific Research Development for the creation of the "CAMERTON" system.

CAMERTON (Russian: Камеры (видеокамеры) + Камертон (синхронизация)) is a Russian global vehicle tracking system. Using tracking software integrated with a distributed network of radar complexes, photo-video fixation and road surveillance cameras, it identifies probable routes and places of the most frequent appearance of a particular vehicle. It was developed and implemented by the "Advanced Scientific - Research Projects" enterprise in St. Petersburg.

Within the framework of the practical use of the system of the Ministry of Internal Affairs of the Russian Federation, the system has enabled identification and solving of especially grave crimes; the system is also operated by other state services and departments.
