= Nachrichtendienstliches Informationssystem =

German security database

The Nachrichtendienstliches Informationssystem (NADIS) (Intelligence agency information system) is a searchable database operated by the German domestic security agency Bundesamt für Verfassungsschutz (BfV). Data stored in the system is readily assessible by the BfV, the foreign intelligence agency Bundesnachrichtendienst (BND), and the military intelligence agency Militärischer Abschirmdienst (MAD).

As of 2008, it contains over a million data sets of personal information.

== NADIS WN ==
On 24 June 2012, the database was upgraded and renamed "NADIS WN".

== International data exchange ==
=== United States ===
In 2012, the BND received information from the United States intelligence community on 1,830 occasions. The information was handed over to the BfV and stored in the NADIS system

== See also ==
- List of government surveillance projects
- Project 6
