= Royal Concierge =

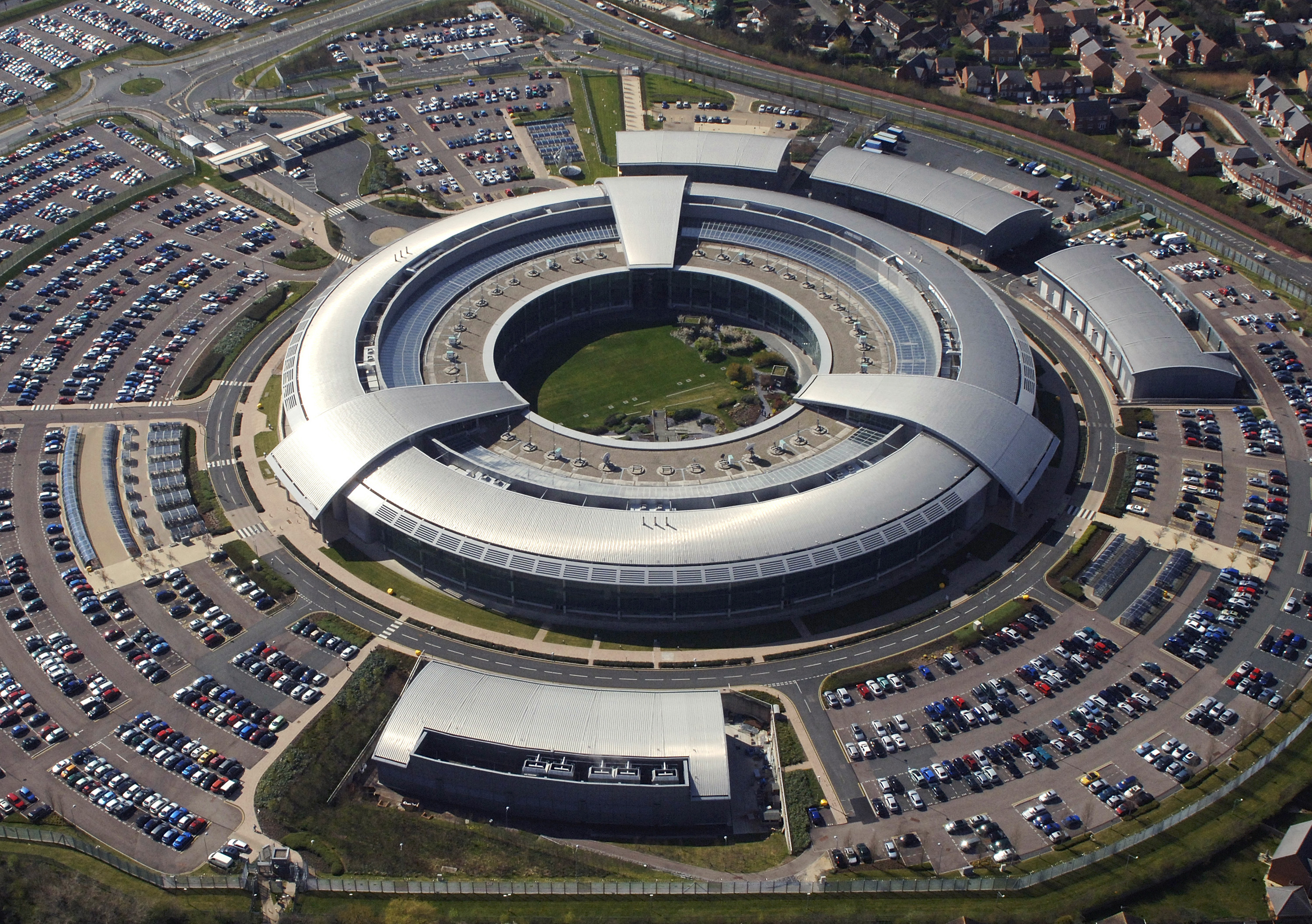
GCHQ in Cheltenham, Gloucestershire

Royal Concierge is the codename of a secret Government Communications Headquarters (GCHQ) programme that watches the bookings made at select hotels worldwide. The programme was introduced in 2010 and monitored 350 hotels around the world. The system alerted GCHQ to a diplomat's travel arrangements and allowed GCHQ to bug rooms in preparation for the diplomat's arrival.
