= Babak Pasdar =

Babak Pasdar is an Iranian-American cyber security author, best known for his contributions in the areas of cloud-based security and as a whistle blower on government warrantless wiretapping. Pasdar was founder, CEO and CTO of IGX Global in 1997 and Bat Blue Networks (Now OPAQ Networks) in 2007. Pasdar exited Bat Blue Networks in 2016 with the sale of his company to OPAQ Networks. He is now founder, CEO and CTO of Acreto IoT Security, focused on addressing emerging security challenges posed by highly distributed and mobile purpose-built internet of things (IoT) devices. Pasdar was selected as one of New York's Top Ten Startup Founders in 2017.

== Early years ==
Pasdar the eldest of three sons was born in Kermanshah, Iran. His father was Koocheck Pasdar, a General in the Iranian Army under the Shah of Iran. His mother Simin Fardsavar-Pasdar was a school teacher from Shiraz, Iran. Pasdar is also related to actor Adrian Pasdar. His family fled Iran to the United States in 1979 to escape the revolution. Arriving to the U.S. under a tourist visa, his family's requests for political asylum were denied, driving a long process for the family to establish themselves legally and financially in the United States.

== Professional career ==
Pasdar was an early entrepreneur, starting his first business while still in high school. At a time when computer memory chips were in significant demand with high prices, Pasdar purchased used mainframe computers at auctions and extracted their memory chips using special techniques he developed. Throughout his career he has been credited for evolving ahead of a constantly commoditizing technology market-space moving from harvesting memory chips, to building PCs, networking, multi-platform integration, Internet communications and eventually cyber security.

In 1992, Pasdar discovered the Internet and quickly moved to start his first Internet Services Company where he developed experience and expertise in Internet Communications technologies. In 1995 while experimenting with unorthodox Internet communications, Pasdar inadvertently compromised the Microsoft corporation. This highlighted to Pasdar the importance of cyber security and how challenged the industry's approach was.

In 1997, Pasdar founded IGX Global, a cyber security company delivering fully operationalized Security as-a-Service. He developed a reputation for effective handling of large-scale and complex projects. This reputation drove Juniper Networks to engage Pasdar in the Verizon Wireless project which led to his whistleblowing on Verizon's warrant-less wiretapping. At IGX Global, Pasdar also invented the first Proxy in-the-Cloud technology called Security Anywhere. This Proxy in-the-Cloud approach became the foundations of many early cloud security technology companies.

In 2007, Pasdar exited IGX Global and formed Bat Blue Networks with a focus on furthering his works around Cloud Delivered Security. At Bat Blue he developed and brought to market the Cloud/SEC platform. Cloud/SEC represented the first platform to deliver full-stack security supporting every port, protocol and application from-the-Cloud. The virtues of the platform were highlighted in Pasdar's 2016 book Unified Cloud Security: The CXO Guide to Building Effective, Agile and Sustainable Security. In 2016 Pasdar exited Bat Blue Networks with the sale of the company to OPAQ Networks.

== Warrant-less wiretapping whistleblower ==
In 2003, Pasdar was engaged by Juniper Networks to re-architect and scale the network and security infrastructure for Verizon Wireless. During the roll-out process Pasdar was made aware of "The Quantico Circuit" that provided a third-party (believed to be the U.S. FBI) unfettered access to all data and voice communications of the carriers' customers. Pasdar's efforts to implement any type of control or logging for the communications to the third-party were met with resistance and subsequent threats from the carriers' management.

Eventually Pasdar blew the Whistle on Verizon Wireless. His public testimony was used to file a $233 billion class-action lawsuit against Verizon Wireless and other carriers alleged to have participated in an illegal warrant-less wiretapping effort by the U.S. Government. Pasdar testified to Congressional Committees including the House Committee on Energy & Commerce, the Subcommittee on Telecommunications & the Internet and the Subcommittee on Oversight & Investigations. He also testified to the Senate Judiciary Committee. His testimony led to a Dear Colleague Letter from congressmen Dingell, Markey and Stupak. In light of the massive $233 billion lawsuit, the Telecommunications Industry lobbied Congress for retroactive immunity. The Immunity Bill H.R. 6304 was passed by the 110th Congress on July 9, 2008.

== Innovations and accomplishments ==
- Proxy-in-the-Cloud in 2001
- Full-stack security from-the-Cloud in 2009
- “Internet Wormholing” Accelerated Internet in 2011
- Network Feature Virtualization (NFV) in 2013 – Patent US9197601 B2
- Distributed Virtualized / Hybrid Data Center Architectures in 2014 (Patent Pending)
- New York's Top Ten Startup Founders Over 40
