= Mastering the Internet =

British mass surveillance project

Mastering the Internet (MTI) is a mass surveillance project led by the British communications intelligence agency Government Communications Headquarters (GCHQ) budgeted at over £1 billion. According to reports in The Register and The Sunday Times in early May 2009, contracts with a total value of £200m had already been awarded to suppliers.

Responding to these reports, GCHQ issued a press release denying the claims that the program involved mass surveillance, stating that "GCHQ is not developing technology to enable the monitoring of all internet use and phone calls in Britain, or to target everyone in the UK." However, the 2013 mass surveillance disclosures revealed that GCHQ gathers "raw" information (without filtering out the communications of British citizens) from the web as part of its "Mastering the Internet" programme.

== Background ==
"Mastering the Internet" (MTI) is a project by the British government and part of the Interception Modernisation Programme (IMP). The system was described in 2009 by The Register and The Sunday Times as the replacement for scrapped plans for a single central database. This involves thousands of DPI black boxes at various internet service providers in association with the GCHQ base in Cheltenham, funded out of a Single Intelligence Account budget of £1.6 bn, including a £200m contract with Lockheed Martin and a contract with BAE Systems Detica.

As of 2013, the system is capable of copying signals from up to 200 fibre-optic cables at all physical points of entry into Great Britain.

== International cooperation ==
=== Canada ===
As early as 2007, John Adams, chief of Canada's intelligence agency Communications Security Establishment, told the Parliament of Canada about plans of the "Five Eyes" to master the Internet in cooperation with the NSA and other allies:

We want to master the Internet. That is a challenge that no one institution – be it ours or the National Security Agency, NSA, for that matter – can manage on their own. We try to do that in conjunction with our allies.

— John Adams

=== United States ===
In 2013, The Guardian provided specific details of financial contributions made by the U.S. National Security Agency (NSA) in "Mastering the Internet" as part of the "Five Eyes" alliance between several English-speaking Western democracies. According to documents leaked by Edward Snowden, the NSA paid the GCHQ over £17.2 million towards running the programme.

== See also ==
- Communications Capabilities Development Programme
- Global Telecoms Exploitation
- Mass surveillance in the United Kingdom
- Tempora
