= Lustre (treaty) =

Lustre is the codename of a secret treaty signed by France and the Five Eyes (FVEY) for cooperation in signals intelligence and for mutual data exchange between their respective intelligence agencies. Its existence was revealed during the 2013 global surveillance disclosure based on documents leaked by the former NSA contractor Edward Snowden.

== Historical background ==
The Directorate-General for External Security (DGSE) of France maintains a close relationship with both the NSA and the GCHQ after discussions for increased cooperation began in November 2006. By the early 2010s, the extent of cooperation in the joint interception of digital data by the DGSE and the NSA was noted to have increased dramatically.

In 2011, a formal memorandum for data exchange was signed by the DGSE and the NSA, which facilitated the transfer of millions of metadata records from the DGSE to the NSA. In 2013, the existence of the Lustre treaty was revealed in documents leaked by the former NSA contractor Edward Snowden.

== Signatories ==
France

- Direction Générale de la Sécurité Extérieure (DGSE) of France

Five Eyes

- Australian Signals Directorate (ASD) of Australia
- Communications Security Establishment of Canada (CSEC)
- Government Communications Security Bureau (GCSB) of New Zealand
- Government Communications Headquarters (GCHQ) of the United Kingdom
- National Security Agency (NSA) of the United States

== Scale of surveillance ==
The French telecommunications corporation Orange S.A. shares customer call data with the French intelligence agency DGSE, and the intercepted data is handed over to GCHQ.

From December 2012 to 8 January 2013, over 70 million metadata records were handed over to the NSA by French intelligence agencies.

== See also ==
- UKUSA Agreement
