= Privacy and Civil Liberties Oversight Board report on mass surveillance =

The Privacy and Civil Liberties Oversight Board report on mass surveillance was issued in January 2014 in light of the global surveillance disclosures of 2013, recommending the US end bulk data collection.

== Background ==
The Privacy and Civil Liberties Oversight Board was first chartered under the Intelligence Reform and Terrorism Prevention Act of 2004.

The role of the board is to provide advice and review of whether adequate supervision, guidelines, and oversight exist and to "continually review" regulations, policies, procedures, and information sharing practices to ensure privacy and civil liberties considerations are protected. To carry out these roles, the board does not have subpoena power, but is able to request subpoenas subject to the U.S. Attorney General's discretion "to protect sensitive law enforcement or counterterrorism information or ongoing operations." The U.S. Director of National Intelligence also has the power to override requests "to protect the national security interests of the United States"

A report by former members of the 9/11 Commission in December 2005 noted there was "little urgency" in creation of the board, whose first meeting was in 2006. It was initially composed of a chair, vice chair, and three other members. As these members served at the pleasure of the President, "Critics ... maintained that the board appeared to be a presidential appendage, devoid of the capability to exercise independent judgment and assessment or to provide impartial findings and recommendations", according to the Congressional Research Service.

Subsequently, member Lanny Davis resigned in protest over the board's lack of independence, citing "extensive redlining by Administration officials of the board's first report to Congress" that was accepted by the other members. The board was then reconstituted under the Implementing Recommendations of the 9/11 Commission Act of 2007 (H.R. 1), beginning in January 2008, as an independent agency with appointments subject to Senate confirmation. Four members of the board were nominated by President Barack Obama in 2011, and confirmed by the Senate in August 2012. Board chairman David Medine was finally confirmed in May 2013 in the wake of the Snowden disclosures in a party-line vote with 53 Democrats supporting and 45 Republicans opposing.

== Global surveillance disclosures ==
The Board's report follows a series of highly publicized leaks about the operations of the global surveillance program conducted by the National Security Agency in the United States working with a number of other countries (see Five Eyes). While the program's nominal focus was on foreign nationals, the disclosures also revealed the large-scale surveillance of communications by United States citizens. These leaks were largely the work of Edward Snowden, a Booz Allen Hamilton employee with access to a wide range of top secret documents. Publications of the documents by The Washington Post and The Guardian began in June 2013.

== Report ==
External videos
- David Medine, chair of PCLOB, on surveillance program January 29, 2014

On January 23, 2014, the board released its report, recommending the US end bulk data collection. Instead federal agencies would be able to obtain phone and other records under court orders in cases containing an individualized suspicion of wrongdoing. But there would be no storehouse, private or public, of telephone data beyond what the phone companies keep in the course of their normal business activities.

The report concluded that the program "lacks a viable legal foundation". It concluded "we see little evidence that the unique capabilities provided by the NSA's bulk collection of telephone records actually have yielded material counterterrorism results that could not have been achieved without the NSA's Section 215 program."

The report concluded: "Cessation of the program would eliminate the privacy and civil liberties concerns associated with bulk collection without unduly hampering the government's efforts, while ensuring that any governmental requests for telephone calling records are tailored to the needs of specific investigations."

The report called for a "Special Advocate" to be involved in some cases before the FISA court judge. The Board also contained the recommendation to release future and past FISC decisions "that involve novel interpretations of FISA or other significant questions of law, technology or compliance."

The report also recommended against an alternate proposal, which President Barack Obama had ordered Attorney General Eric Holder to formulate within 60 days, which would force third parties including telephone companies to conduct data retention. The panel's majority spokesman said this was due to cost and legal exposure for the companies involved, and that it was not an "easy out".

== Reactions ==
Sen. Ron Wyden, a senior member of the intelligence committee and long-time critic of the programs, released a statement in reaction to the report. Said Wyden:

"The privacy board's findings closely mirror many of the criticisms made by surveillance reform advocates. The bulk collection program was built on a murky legal foundation that raises many constitutional questions and has been proven to be an ineffective tool for collecting unique intelligence information. As the board wrote in its report, a program where the government collects the telephone records of millions of law-abiding Americans 'fundamentally shifts the balance of power between the state and its citizens.' The board goes on to say that with the government's 'powers of compulsion and criminal prosecution,' collection of data on its own citizens 'poses unique threats to privacy,' and is expected to have a 'chilling effect on the free exercise of speech and association.'"

Asked by Pat Mächler to what extent the report will have an impact, Edward Snowden stated:

I don't see how Congress could ignore it, as it makes it clear there is no reason at all to maintain the 215 program. Let me quote from the official report: "Cessation of the program would eliminate the privacy and civil liberties concerns associated with bulk collection without unduly hampering the government's efforts, while ensuring that any governmental requests for telephone calling records are tailored to the needs of specific investigations."

== See also ==
- Mass surveillance in the United States
