= MYSTIC =

Intelligence program (2009–2014)

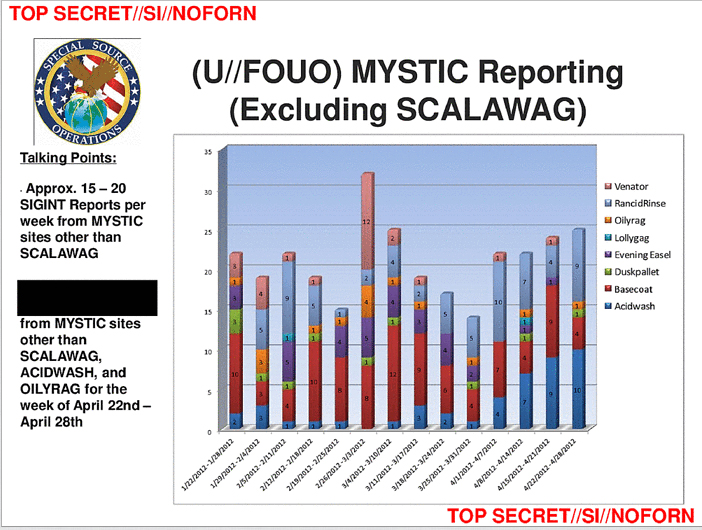
MYSTIC reporting for the Philippines (VENATOR), Mexico (EVENINGEASEL), Kenya (DUSKPALLET), the Bahamas (BASECOAT) and the initially unnamed country from January through April 2012

MYSTIC was a National Security Agency (NSA) program between 2009 and 2014 that collected metadata and telephony. The program's existence was revealed in March 2014 from documents leaked by Edward Snowden.

== History ==
According to documents leaked by Edward Snowden, the MYSTIC program started in 2009. In 2011, it had the capability to record the content of phone calls in an entire country for 30 days. Documents from 2013 indicated the program may have been extended to other countries. MYSTIC operated under the legal authority of Executive Order 12333.

On March 18, 2014, the existence of the program was published in The Washington Post, based upon documents leaked by Snowden. On May 19, The Intercept identified Mexico, the Philippines, Kenya, the Bahamas and an initially unidentified country as targets of NSA's metadata collection. For the latter two countries, the NSA not only collected the metadata, but also the content of phone calls. This took place under the SOMALGET sub-program.

=== Afghanistan ===
In March 2014, former NSA Deputy Director John C. Inglis had already said that the other country was Iraq, but on May 19, an analysis published on the website Cryptome identified the country as Afghanistan. Several days later, on May 23, WikiLeaks also reported that Afghanistan was the country of which the NSA collected nearly all phone calls.

On September 9, 2015, US Director of National Intelligence James Clapper said that the disclosure of what reporters believed to be the MYSTIC and/or SOMALGET program, led the Afghan government to immediately close down an important intelligence program, that "was the single most important source of force protection and warning for our people in Afghanistan", according to Clapper.

== Scope ==
Under a sub-program of MYSTIC codenamed SOMALGET, the NSA recorded and archived the content of "virtually every" phone call for thirty days. After thirty days, the recorded calls are overwritten by newer phone calls, although concern was raised that the NSA may start storing collected phone calls indefinitely. Although NSA analysts could listen to less than 1% of the phone calls collected under MYSTIC, millions of voice clips were forwarded for processing and storage every month.

The American Civil Liberties Union (ACLU) criticized the program, stating that the NSA had the ability to record anything it wants to. It was also noted that MYSTIC is the first revealed NSA surveillance operation capable of monitoring and recording an entire nation's telecommunication system.

== Impact ==
The NSA documents said that MYSTIC collection in the Bahamas resulted in the apprehension of narcotics traffickers. The US government has also not yet shared information with the Bahamas, despite indicating that it would.

== See also ==
- Global surveillance disclosures (2013–present)
- List of government mass surveillance projects
