= Tempora =

GCHQ-operated Internet and telephone surveillance system

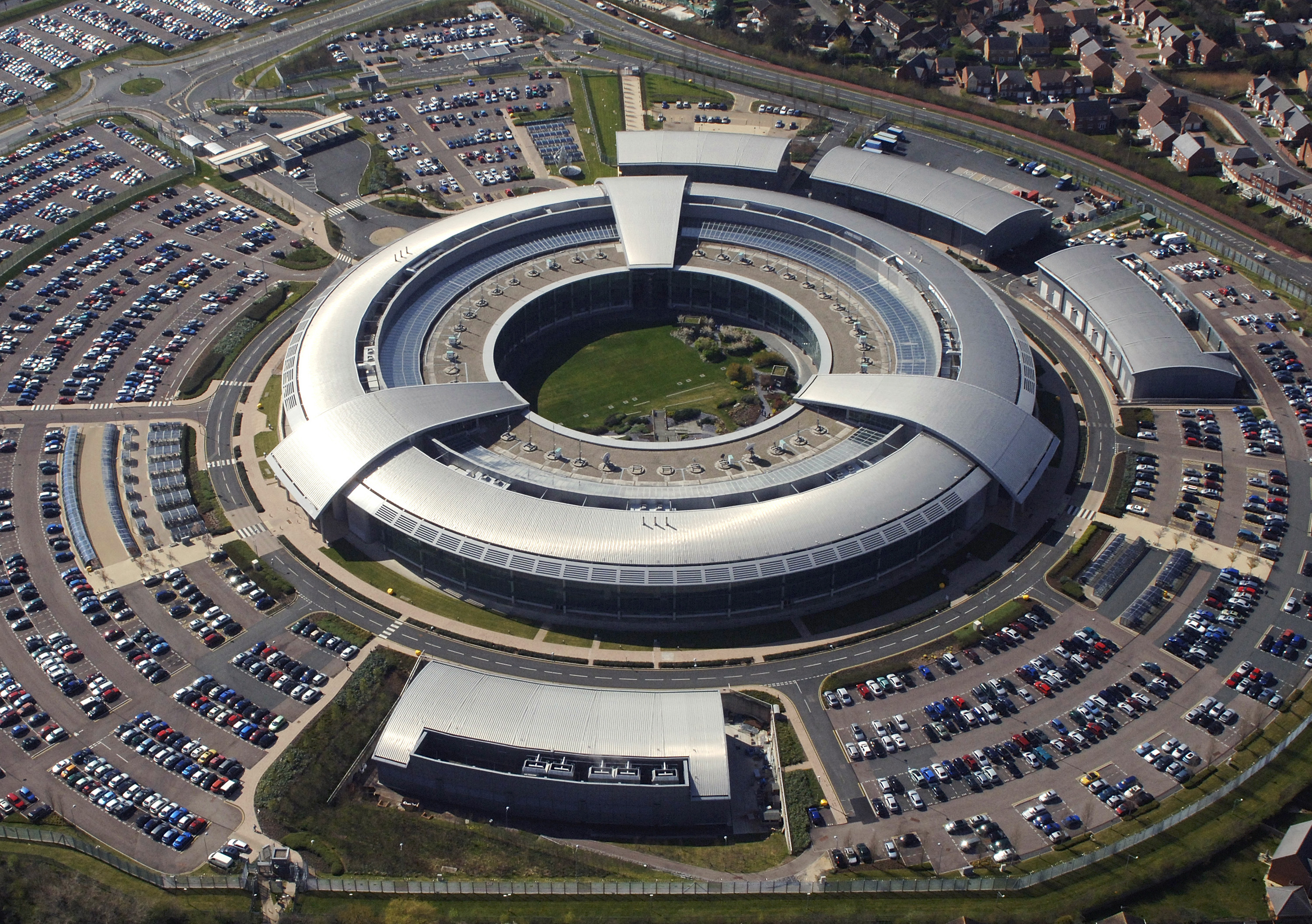
The Government Communications Headquarters (GCHQ) operates "Tempora"

Tempora is the codeword for a formerly-secret computer system that is used by the British Government Communications Headquarters (GCHQ). This system is used to buffer most Internet communications that are extracted from fibre-optic cables, so these can be processed and searched at a later time. It was tested from 2008 and became operational in late 2011.

Tempora uses intercepts on the fibre-optic cables that serve as the backbone of the Internet to gain access to large amounts of Internet users' personal data, without any individual suspicion or targeting. The intercepts are placed in the United Kingdom and on the UK military base at Ayios Nikolaos in the British Overseas Territory of Akrotiri and Dhekelia. The intercepts are placed with the knowledge of companies owning either the cables or landing stations.

The existence of Tempora was revealed in the Snowden disclosures. Documents Snowden acquired showed that data collected by the Tempora programme is shared with the National Security Agency of the United States.

== Operation ==
According to Edward Snowden, Tempora has two principal components called "Mastering the Internet" (MTI) and "Global Telecoms Exploitation" (GTE). He claimed that each is intended to collate online and telephone traffic. This contradicts two original documents, which say that Tempora is only for Internet traffic, just like the XKeyscore system of the NSA, components of which are incorporated in Tempora.

It is alleged that GCHQ produces larger amounts of metadata than NSA. By May 2012, 300 GCHQ analysts and 250 NSA analysts had been assigned to sort data.

The Guardian claims that no distinction is made in the gathering of data between public citizens and targeted suspects. Tempora is said to include recordings of telephone calls, the content of email messages, Facebook entries and the personal Internet history of users. Snowden said of Tempora that "It's not just a U.S. problem. The U.K. has a huge dog in this fight...They [GCHQ] are worse than the U.S."

Claims exist that Tempora was possible only by way of secret agreements with commercial companies, described in Snowden's leaked documents as "intercept partners". Some companies are alleged to have been paid for their co-operation. Snowden also alleged that GCHQ staff were urged to disguise the origin of material in their reports for fear that the role of the companies as intercept partners would cause "high-level political fallout". The companies are forbidden to reveal the existence of warrants compelling them to allow GCHQ access to the cables. If the companies fail to comply they can be compelled to do so.

Lawyers for GCHQ said it would be impossible to list the total number of people targeted by Tempora because "this would be an infinite list which we couldn't manage".

GCHQ set up a three-year trial at GCHQ Bude in Cornwall. GCHQ had probes attached to more than 201 Internet links by mid-2011; each probe carried 10 gigabits of data a second. NSA analysts were brought into the trials, and Tempora was launched in 2011, with data shared with the NSA. Ongoing technical work is expanding GCHQ's capacity to collect data from new super cables that carry data at 100 gigabits a second. The data is preserved for three days while metadata is kept for thirty days.

Tempora comprises different components, like the actual access points to fibre-optic cables, a sanitisation programme codenamed POKERFACE, the XKEYSCORE system developed by NSA, and a Massive Volume Reduction (MVR) capability.

In May 2012, GCHQ had Tempora systems installed at the following locations:

- 16 for 10 gigabit/second cables at the CPC processing centre
- 7 for 10 gigabit/second cables at the OPC processing centre
- 23 for 10 gigabit/second cables at the RPC1 processing centre

== Reactions ==
UK defence officials issued a confidential DA-Notice to the BBC and other media asking the media to refrain from running further stories related to surveillance leaks including US PRISM programme and the British involvement therein.

The US Army has restricted its employees' access to the Guardian website since the beginning of the NSA leaks of PRISM and Tempora "in order to prevent an unauthorised disclosure of classified information."

German Federal Minister of Justice Sabine Leutheusser-Schnarrenberger tweeted that she considered the programme an "Alptraum" ("nightmare") and demanded that European Union institutions investigate the matter.

Jan Philipp Albrecht, German Member of the European Parliament and spokesperson for Justice and Home Affairs of the Greens/EFA parliamentary group, called for an infringement procedure against the United Kingdom for having violated its obligations relating to the protection of individuals with regard to the processing of personal data under Article 16 of the Treaties of the European Union.

In September 2018, the European Court of Human Rights ruled that the UK's mass data interception and retention programmes, including Tempora, "was unlawful and incompatible with the conditions necessary for a democratic society".

== See also ==
- INDECT – European Union project
- Karma Police (surveillance program)
- List of government surveillance projects
- Mass surveillance in the United Kingdom
- MUSCULAR
- Signals intelligence
- Tempora mutantur – Latin adage
- UKUSA SIGINT Agreement
- NSA ANT catalog
- Communications Assistance for Law Enforcement Act (CALEA)
- Global surveillance disclosures (2013–present)
- Website visitor tracking
- Browsing history
- Web analytics
- Web mining
- Surveillance
- Internet privacy
