= Global Telecoms Exploitation =

Alleged British mass surveillance programme

Global Telecoms Exploitation is reportedly a secret British telephonic mass surveillance programme run by the British signals intelligence and computer security agency, the Government Communications Headquarters (GCHQ). Its existence was revealed along with its sister programme, Mastering the Internet, in June 2013, as part of the global surveillance disclosures by the former National Security Agency contractor Edward Snowden.

In May 2014, Glenn Greenwald, in his book "Nowhere to Hide: Edward Snowden, the NSA and US Government Spying", published documents relating to the program, in addition to those previously published in the press around the world.

== See also ==
- Mass surveillance in the United Kingdom
- Mastering the Internet
- Tempora
