= John Adams (Canadian general) =

Canadian politician

Chief of the Communications Security Establishment Canada
- In office July 2005 – January 2012
- Preceded by: Keith Coulter
- Succeeded by: John Forster

Personal details
- Born: John Lawrence Adams; May 31, 1942 (age 83) Saint John, New Brunswick

John Lawrence Adams, CMM CD, (born May 31, 1942) was the Chief of the Communications Security Establishment Canada and Associate Deputy Minister of National Defence from July 2005 to January 2012. He was succeeded by John Forster.

Adams graduated from the Royal Military College of Canada, earning a Bachelor of Engineering degree in chemical engineering in 1965. Adams is also a Rhodes Scholar after graduating, in 1967, with a Bachelor of Arts degree from Oxford University, in England, in 1967. He also graduated from the Army Staff College as well as the National Defence College. Adams joined the Canadian Forces in 1967 and served until 1993. He took on many roles, from command of 1 Combat Engineer Regiment in Chilliwack, British Columbia (CFB Chilliwack) to posts at National Defence Headquarters. He retired with the rank of Major-General.

After his retirement from the Canadian Forces, Adams was appointed Assistant Deputy Minister, Infrastructure and Environment, for National Defence. He left that post in 1998. From 2003 to June 2005, as Associate Deputy Minister and Commissioner of the Canadian Coast Guard, and from 1998 to 2003 as Assistant Deputy Minister, Marine Services and Commissioner, Canadian Coast Guard for Fisheries and Oceans Canada. In 1992, he was made a Commander of the Order of Military Merit. He is a recipient of Queen Elizabeth II Silver Jubilee Medal (1977), the 125th Anniversary of the Confederation of Canada Medal (1992), the Queen Elizabeth II Golden Jubilee Medal (2002). and the Queen Elizabeth II Diamond Jubilee Medal (2012).
