= Karma Police (surveillance programme) =

Internet mass surveillance programme

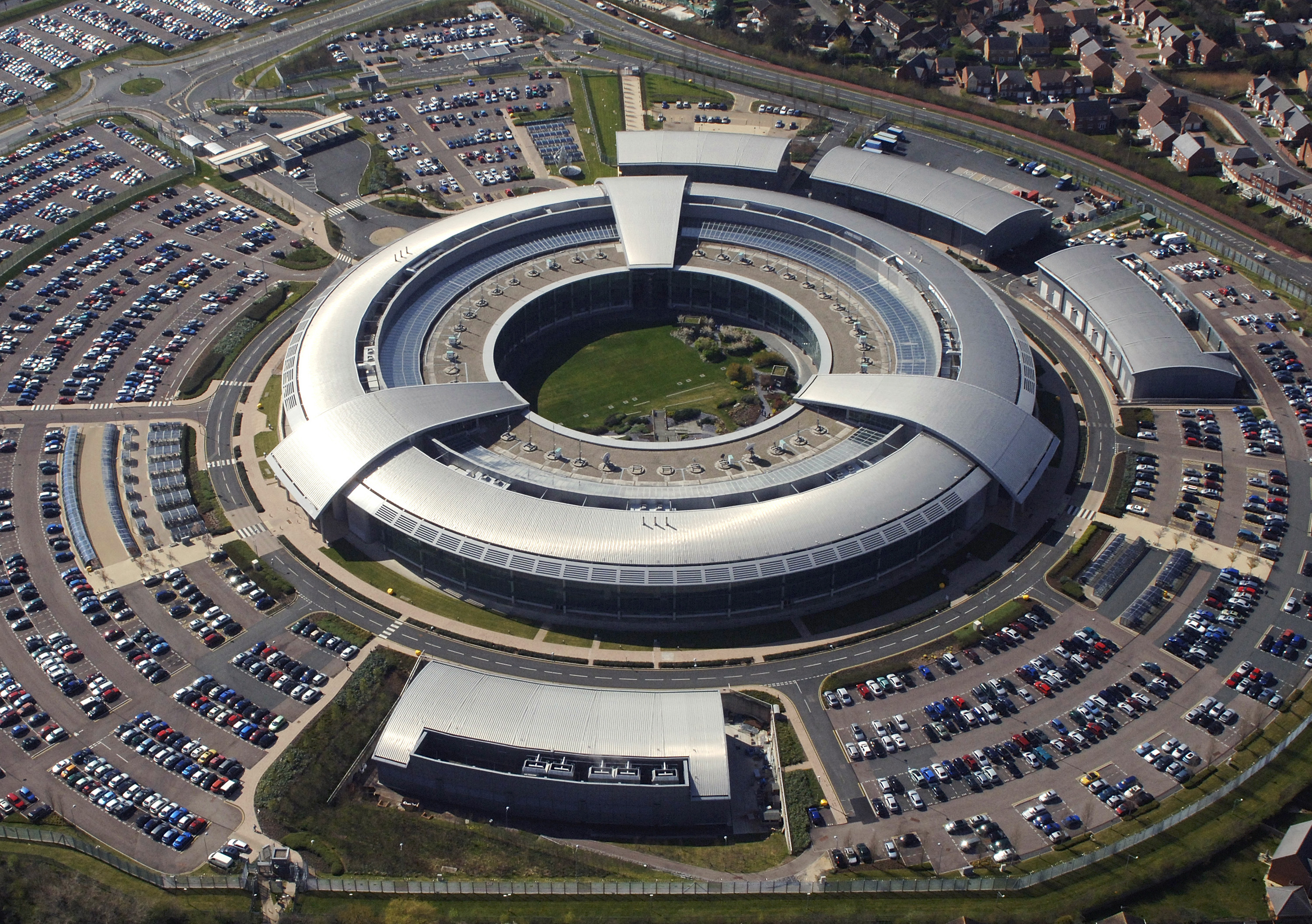
An aerial image of the Government Communications Headquarters (GCHQ) in Cheltenham, Gloucestershire.

Karma Police (usually capitalised as KARMA POLICE) is the code name for an Internet mass surveillance and data collection programme operated by the United Kingdom's Government Communications Headquarters (GCHQ).

In 2015, documents obtained by The Intercept from U.S. National Security Agency whistleblower Edward Snowden revealed that GCHQ had carried out the KARMA POLICE operation since about 2008. The KARMA POLICE operation swept up the IP address of Internet users visiting websites. The program was established with no public scrutiny or oversight. KARMA POLICE is a powerful spying tool in conjunction with other GCHQ programs, because IP addresses could be cross-referenced with other data. The goal of the program, according to the documents, was "either (a) a web browsing profile for every visible user on the internet, or (b) a user profile for every visible website on the internet."

Karma Police was apparently named after the Radiohead song "Karma Police", which includes the lyric "This is what you’ll get when you mess with us".

== See also ==
- Tempora – another programme revealed by Snowden
- Joint Threat Research Intelligence Group – another GCHQ programme
- Website visitor tracking
- Web browsing history
- Web analytics
- Web mining
- Internet privacy
- Mass surveillance in the United Kingdom
