= A Good American =

- Directed by: Friedrich Moser
- Written by: Friedrich Moser
- Produced by: Friedrich Moser
- Starring: William Binney; J. Kirk Wiebe (Senior Intelligence Analyst); Thomas Drake; Diane Roark; Jesselyn Radack
- Cinematography: Friedrich Moser
- Edited by: Jesper Osmund; Kirk von Heflin
- Music by: Guy Farley; Christopher Slaski
- Release date: 2015
- Country: Austria
- Language: English

A Good American is a 2015 Austrian documentary film that chronicles the work of whistleblower William Binney, a former official of the National Security Agency who resigned shortly after the September 11 attacks.

The film contends that Binney's work was thwarted by high officials of the agency, and that he might have been able to prevent the attacks. The film was produced, directed and written by Friedrich Moser.

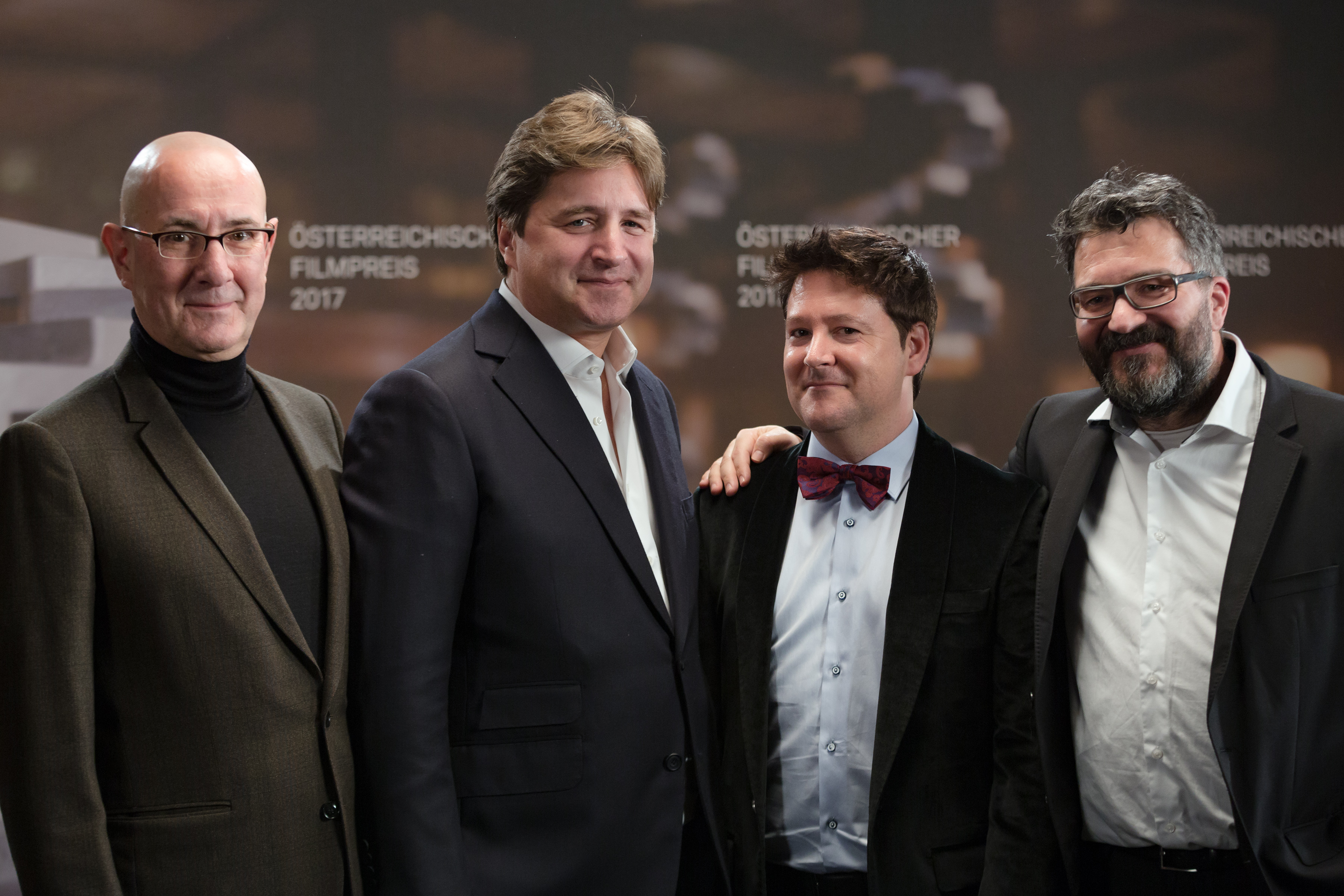
Michael Seeber, Guy Farley, Christopher Slaski and Friedrich Moser (2017)

== Background ==
In September 2002, Binney and two other NSA whistleblowers, J. Kirk Wiebe and Edward Loomis, asked the U.S. Defense Department Inspector General to investigate the NSA for allegedly wasting "millions and millions of dollars" on the Trailblazer Project, which analyzed intercepted data covertly obtained from communications networks. Loomis and Binney had been the inventors of ThinThread, a far less expensive alternative system that was shelved in favor of Trailblazer.

The Nation reported that "despite ThinThread’s proven capacity to collect actionable intelligence, agency director Gen. Michael Hayden vetoed the idea of deploying the system in August 2001, just three weeks before 9/11." Hayden’s decisions, the whistleblowers told The Nation, "left the NSA without a system to analyze the trillions of bits of foreign SIGINT flowing over the Internet at warp speed, as ThinThread could do."

== Synopsis ==
The film consists mainly of interviews with Binney and other former NSA officials and congressional staffers, as well as reenactments. By way of background information, Binney describes how he entered government service during the Vietnam War, and over time, using antiquated computer systems, created ThinThread, which he and the other officials describe as less intrusive than Trailblazer, which was lacking the privacy safeguards built into ThinThread. According to Binney, not only was Trailblazer unnecessarily intrusive, it was less effective.

The documentary contends that the ThinThread system would have prevented the September 11 attacks, and that a post-attack evaluation confirmed this.

== Critical reception ==
The film has a score of 63 on Metacritic, based on generally favorable reviews.

Variety called the film "compelling if only semi-persuasive," and said that it was marred by bias toward Binney. The Guardian described the film as a "fascinating, conspiracy theorising documentary", and said that while "some of the film's content has been aired before, the inside experience has not been voiced in such a collective manner, with Moser joining the dots just as Binney might connect his metadata."

The New York Times said that the film "borrows heavily from Errol Morris, employing re-enactments, moving graphics and a Philip Glass-like score." The film, it said, "gets bogged down in details and personnel talk, but its subjects have an urgent narrative to tell".
