= ThinThread =

NSA intelligence gathering project

ThinThread was an intelligence gathering project by the United States National Security Agency (NSA) conducted throughout the 1990s. The program involved wiretapping and sophisticated analysis of the resulting data. The program was discontinued three weeks before the September 11, 2001 attacks due to the changes in priorities and the consolidation of U.S. intelligence authority.

The "change in priority" consisted of the decision made by the director of NSA General Michael V. Hayden to go with a concept called Trailblazer, despite the fact that ThinThread was a working prototype that claimed to protect the privacy of U.S. citizens. ThinThread was dismissed and replaced by the Trailblazer Project, which lacked the privacy protections. A consortium led by Science Applications International Corporation was awarded a $280 million contract to develop Trailblazer in 2002.

== Whistleblowing ==
Redacted version of the DoD Inspector General audit, obtained through FOIA

A group of former NSA workers—Kirk Wiebe, William Binney, Ed Loomis, and Thomas A. Drake, along with House Intelligence Committee staffer Diane Roark (an expert on the NSA budget)—believed the operational prototype system called ThinThread was a better solution than Trailblazer, which was just a concept on paper at the time. They complained to the DoD Inspector General office in 2002 about mismanagement and the waste of taxpayer money at the NSA surrounding the Trailblazer program. In 2007 the FBI raided the homes of these people, an evolution of President Bush's crackdown on whistleblowers and "leaks" after the New York Times disclosed a separate program (see NSA warrantless surveillance controversy). In 2010, one of the people who had helped the IG in the ensuing investigation, NSA official Thomas Andrews Drake, was charged with espionage, part of the Obama administration's crackdown on whistleblowers and "leaks". The original charges against him were later dropped and he pleaded to a misdemeanor.

The result of the DoD IG complaint was a 2004 audit report that was released under FOIA in 2011. Although highly redacted, the report contained significant criticisms of Trailblazer, and included some relatively minor criticisms of ThinThread, for example, citing a low "quality of service and support" from the ThinThread program team, a lack of documentation, a lack of a configuration management system, and a lack of a trouble ticket system. However, "The findings that led to the recommendations would not have prevented the successful deployment of THINTHREAD ... the recommendations were made to improve the operational efficiency of THINTHREAD after it was deployed ..."

== Technical details ==
The program would have used a technique of encrypting sensitive privacy information in an effort to comply with legal concerns, and would have automatically identified potential threats. The sources of the data for this program would have included "massive phone and e-mail data," but the extent of this information is not clear. Only once a threat was discovered, would the data be decrypted for analysis by agents.

ThinThread would have bundled together four cutting-edge surveillance tools.:

- Used more sophisticated methods of sorting through massive phone and e-mail data to identify suspect communications.
- Identified U.S. phone numbers and other communications data and encrypted them to ensure caller privacy.
- Employed an automated auditing system to monitor how analysts handled the information, in order to prevent misuse and improve efficiency.
- Analyzed the data to identify relationships between callers and chronicle their contacts. Only when evidence of a potential threat had been developed would analysts be able to request decryption of the records. This component is known as MAINWAY and, according to Pulitzer Prize winning journalist James Risen, "MAINWAY [became] the heart of the NSA's domestic spying program."

Intelligence experts describe as rigorous the testing of ThinThread in 1998, the project succeeding at each task with high marks. For example, its ability to sort through massive amounts of data to find threat-related communications far surpassed the existing system. It also was able to rapidly separate and encrypt U.S.-related communications to ensure privacy.

The Pentagon report concluded that ThinThread's ability to sort through data in 2001 was far superior to that of another NSA system in place in 2004, and that the program should be launched and enhanced. ThinThread was designed to address two key challenges: One, the NSA had more information than it could digest, and, two, increasingly its targets were in contact with people in the United States whose calls the agency was prohibited from monitoring.

Trailblazer had more political support internally because it was initiated by Michael Hayden when he first arrived at the NSA.

NSA's existing system for data-sorting had produced a database clogged with corrupted and useless information. The mass collection of relatively unsorted data, combined with system flaws erroneously flagging people as suspect, had produced numerous false leads, draining analyst resources. NSA leads had resulted in numerous dead ends.

NSA dropped the component that monitored for abuse of records. It not only tracked the use of the database, but hunted for the most effective analysis techniques, and some analysts thought it would be used to judge their performance. Within the NSA, the primary advocate for the ThinThread program was Richard Taylor. Taylor has retired from the NSA.

One intelligence official told the Baltimore Sun that ThinThread "was designed very carefully from a legal point of view, so that even in non-wartime, you could have done it legitimately." However, Michael Hayden asserts in his memoir that in 2000 lawyers at the NSA and Justice Department would not allow the deployment of ThinThread because it would be illegal, despite its use of encryption for US citizen data: "The answer from Justice was... clear: 'You can't do this...'"

== End of the project ==
The project was ended by General Michael Hayden after successful testing, and while the privacy elements were not retained, Hayden admitted that the analysis technology is the underlying basis of current NSA analysis techniques, saying in an interview: "But we judged fundamentally that as good as [ThinThread] was, and believe me, we pulled a whole bunch of elements out of it and used it for our final solution for these problems, as good as it was, it couldn’t scale sufficiently to the volume of modern communications .

Some anonymous NSA officials told Hosenball of Newsweek that the ThinThread program, like Trailblazer, was a "wasteful failure". However, as noted, the MAINWAY component of ThinThread was deployed after 9/11. NSA even tried to put ThinThread into effect before 9/11. Hayden confessed in his memoir that in 2000, fearing further terrorist attacks like the Millennium Plot, he gave the order to put ThinThread into action: "Let me be clear: This was me arguing for a limited use of the Thin Thread approach prior to 9/11." The only reason ThinThread was not put into use was because it was deemed to be illegal under US law at that time.

== See also ==
- NSA electronic surveillance program
- Stellar Wind (code name)
- Trailblazer Project
- PRISM (surveillance program)
- Mark Klein
- Thomas Tamm
- Russ Tice
- Edward Snowden
- A Good American, 2015 documentary film about the program and its discontinuation
