= J. Kirk Wiebe =

Retired NSA Senior Intelligence Analyst

John Kirk (J. Kirk) Wiebe is a former senior intelligence official with the United States National Security Agency and whistleblower on NSA mass surveillance of Americans. Wiebe worked at the NSA for over 32 years, managing data collection, processing, and analysis programs before retiring in October 2001. He is a member of Veteran Intelligence Professionals for Sanity.

== Early life and career ==
Born in Chicago, Illinois, Wiebe grew up in northern Indiana near Lake Michigan. After graduating high school, he enlisted in the United States Air Force, serving four years with the intelligence branch from 1963–1967. He also attended the University of Maryland from 1965 to 1967. He then attended Indiana University Bloomington, receiving a master's degree in Russian in 1974, before joining the National Security Agency.

== Whistleblowing and activism ==
In September 2002, Wiebe, along with William Binney and Edward Loomis, asked the U.S. Defense Department Inspector General to investigate the NSA for allegedly wasting "millions and millions of dollars" on the Trailblazer Project. Binney and Loomis had developed a competing system, ThinThread, which was shelved when Trailblazer was chosen. According to Wiebe, Trailblazer represented a significant intelligence failure due to lost intelligence during its development.

== Public statements ==
=== Metadata privacy ===
Wiebe has spoken publicly about the privacy implications of metadata collection. In a June 2013 interview on Fox News following the Edward Snowden disclosures, Wiebe stated that "aggregated metadata can be more revealing than content," explaining that location data, transaction records, and call patterns can be combined to construct detailed profiles of individuals' activities and associations.

=== Russian election interference ===
As a member of Veteran Intelligence Professionals for Sanity, Wiebe supported colleague Binney's view that the U.S. intelligence community's assessment that Russia hacked the DNC in the 2016 presidential election was incorrect. VIPS members argued the emails were downloaded locally and leaked by an insider. This view was disputed by the broader intelligence community and independent cybersecurity researchers.

=== 2020 presidential election ===
Wiebe supported True the Vote's claims regarding voter roll irregularities in the 2020 United States presidential election.
