= Perry Fellwock =

American whistleblower (born 1947)

Perry Douglas Fellwock
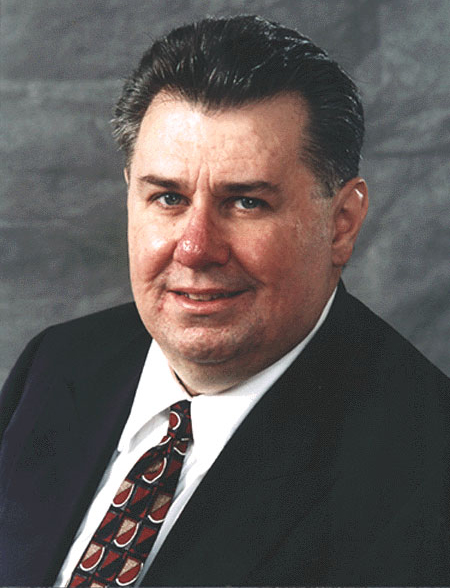
- Born: 1947 (age 78–79)
- Other name: Winslow Peck
- Occupations: SIGINT analyst; IT security consultant; antiques dealer
- Employer(s): USAF, NSA, self
- Organization: Committee for Action/Research on the Intelligence Community (CARIC)
- Known for: Whistleblowing revealing existence of and mass eavesdropping of NSA
- Notable work: CounterSpy

Perry Fellwock (born 1947) is a former National Security Agency (NSA) analyst and whistleblower who revealed the existence of the NSA and its worldwide covert surveillance network in an interview, using the pseudonym Winslow Peck, with Ramparts in 1971. At the time that Fellwock blew the whistle on ECHELON, the NSA was a nearly unknown organization and among the most secretive of the US intelligence agencies. Fellwock revealed that it had a significantly larger budget than the Central Intelligence Agency (CIA). Fellwock was motivated by Daniel Ellsberg's release of the Pentagon Papers. Today, Fellwock has been acknowledged as the first NSA whistleblower.

ECHELON is the name popularly given to the signals intelligence (SIGINT) collection and analysis network operated on behalf of the five signatory states (so called "Five Eyes" FVEY) to the UKUSA Security Agreement. According to information in a European Parliament document "On the existence of a global system for the interception of private and commercial communications (ECHELON interception system)", ECHELON was ostensibly created to monitor the military and diplomatic communications of the Soviet Union and its Eastern Bloc allies during the Cold War in the early 1960s.

Because of the Fellwock revelations, the U.S. Senate United States Senate Select Committee to Study Governmental Operations with Respect to Intelligence Activities ("Church Committee" as it was chaired by Frank Church) introduced successful legislation in 1973 to stop the NSA from spying on American citizens.

Speaking about ECHELON, Frank Church said:

"...[T]hat capability at any time could be turned around on the American people and no American would have any privacy left, such [is] the capability to monitor everything: telephone conversations, telegrams, it doesn't matter. There would be no place to hide. If this government ever became a tyranny, if a dictator ever took charge in this country, the technological capacity that the intelligence community has given the government could enable it to impose total tyranny, and there would be no way to fight back, because the most careful effort to combine together in resistance to the government, no matter how privately it was done, is within the reach of the government to know. Such is the capability of this technology ... I don't want to see this country ever go across the bridge. I know the capacity that is there to make tyranny total in America, and we must see to it that this agency and all agencies that possess this technology operate within the law and under proper supervision, so that we never cross over that abyss. That is the abyss from which there is no return."

The Church Committee hearings and other congressional hearings into abuses by the Nixon Administration by a committee chaired by Sam Ervin helped lead to the passage of the Foreign Intelligence Surveillance Act ("FISA") Pub. L. 95–511, 92 Stat. 1783, 50 U.S.C. ch. 36 in 1978. FISA prescribes procedures for the physical and electronic surveillance and collection of "foreign intelligence information" between "foreign powers" and "agents of foreign powers" (which may include American citizens and permanent residents suspected of espionage or terrorism) in 1978. After the September 11 attacks, the law was amended, enabling President George W. Bush to expand the warrantless surveillance of American citizens.

== Early life and education ==
Fellwock joined the United States Air Force in 1966. After his initial training, he was posted as an analyst to Karamürsel, near Istanbul. From 1968 to 1969, he spent 13 months in Vietnam during the Vietnam War and was stationed at Pleiku Air Base. Upon his return from Vietnam, he transferred to the Air Force Reserves.

== See also ==
- James Bamford
- William Binney, Diane Roark, Thomas Andrews Drake, Mark Klein, Edward Snowden, Thomas Tamm, Russ Tice
- William Hamilton Martin and Bernon F. Mitchell
- Herbert O. Yardley
