= Trailblazer Project =

US government surveillance program

Trailblazer was a United States National Security Agency (NSA) program intended to develop a capability to analyze data carried on communications networks like the Internet. It was intended to track entities using communication methods such as cell phones and e-mail.

NSA employees J. Kirk Wiebe, William Binney, Ed Loomis, and House Permanent Select Committee on Intelligence staff Diane Roark complained to the Department of Defense's Inspector General (IG) about waste, fraud, and abuse in the program, and the fact that a successful operating prototype existed. The complaint was accepted by the IG and an investigation began that lasted until mid-2005 when the final results were issued. The results were largely hidden, as the report given to the public was heavily (90%) redacted, while the original report was heavily classified, thus restricting the ability of most people to see it.

The people who filed the IG complaint were later raided by armed Federal Bureau of Investigation (FBI) agents. While the U.S. government threatened to prosecute all who signed the IG report, it ultimately chose to pursue an NSA Senior Executive Thomas Andrews Drake who helped with the report internally to NSA and who had spoken with a reporter about the project. Drake was later charged under the Espionage Act of 1917. His defenders claimed this was retaliation. The charges against him were later dropped, and he agreed to plead guilty to having committed a misdemeanor under the Computer Fraud and Abuse Act, something that Jesselyn Radack of the Government Accountability Project, which helped represent him, called an "act of civil disobedience".

== Background ==
Trailblazer was chosen over a similar program named ThinThread, a less costly project which had been designed with built-in privacy protections for United States citizens. Trailblazer was later linked to the NSA electronic surveillance program and the NSA warrantless surveillance controversy.

In 2002, a consortium led by Science Applications International Corporation was chosen by the NSA to produce a technology demonstration platform in a contract worth $280 million. Project participants included Boeing, Computer Sciences Corporation, and Booz Allen Hamilton. The project was overseen by NSA Deputy Director William B. Black, Jr., an NSA worker who had gone to SAIC, and then been re-hired back to NSA by NSA director Michael Hayden in 2000. SAIC had also hired a former NSA director to its management: Bobby Inman. SAIC also participated in the concept definition phase of Trailblazer.

Redacted version of the DoD Inspector General audit, obtained through the Freedom of Information Act by the Project on Government Oversight and others

The NSA Inspector General issued a report on Trailblazer that "discussed improperly based contract cost increases, non-conformance in the management of the Statement of Work, and excessive labor rates for contractor personnel."

In 2004 the DoD IG report criticized the program (see the Whistleblowing section below). It said that the "NSA 'disregarded solutions to urgent national security needs'" and "that TRAILBLAZER was poorly executed and overly expensive..." Several contractors for the project were worried about cooperating with DoD's audit for fear of "management reprisal." The Director of NSA "nonconcurred" with several statements in the IG audit, and the report contains a discussion of those disagreements.

In 2005, NSA director Michael Hayden told a Senate hearing that the Trailblazer program was several hundred million dollars over budget and years behind schedule. In 2006 the program was shut down after having cost billions of US dollars. Several anonymous NSA sources told Newsweek later on that the project was a "wasteful failure".

The new project replacing Trailblazer is called Turbulence.

== Whistleblowing ==
According to a 2011 New Yorker article, in the early days of the project several NSA employees met with Diane S Roark, an NSA budget expert on the House Intelligence Committee. They aired their grievances about Trailblazer. In response, NSA director Michael Hayden sent out a memo saying that "individuals, in a session with our congressional overseers, took a position in direct opposition to one that we had corporately decided to follow... Actions contrary to our decisions will have a serious adverse effect on our efforts to transform N.S.A., and I cannot tolerate them."

In September 2002, several people filed a complaint with the Department of Defense IG's office regarding problems with Trailblazer: they included Roark (aforementioned), as well as ex-NSA senior analysts Bill Binney, Kirk Wiebe, and Senior Computer Systems Analyst Ed Loomis, who had all quit the agency over concerns about its mismanagement of acquisition and allegedly illegal domestic spying. A major source for the report was NSA senior officer Thomas Andrews Drake. Drake had been complaining to his superiors for some time about problems at the agency, and about the superiority of ThinThread over Trailblazer, for example, at protecting privacy. Drake gave info to DoD during its investigation of the matter. Roark also went to her boss at the House committee, Porter Goss, about problems, but was rebuffed. She also attempted to contact William Rehnquist, the Supreme Court Chief Justice at the time.

In 2003, the NSA IG (not the DoD IG) had declared Trailblazer an expensive failure. It had cost more than $1 billion.

In 2005, the DoD IG produced a report on the result of its investigation of the complaint of Roark and the others in 2002. This report was not released to the public, but it has been described as very negative. Jane Mayer writes that it hastened the closure of Trailblazer, which was at the time in trouble from Congress for being over budget.

In November 2005, Drake contacted Siobhan Gorman, a reporter of The Baltimore Sun. Gorman wrote several articles about problems at the NSA, including articles on Trailblazer. This series got her an award from the Society of Professional Journalists.

In 2005, President George W. Bush ordered the FBI to find whoever had disclosed information about the NSA electronic surveillance program and its disclosure in The New York Times. Eventually, this investigation led to the people who had filed the 2002 DoD IG request, even though they had nothing to do with The New York Times disclosure. In 2007, the houses of Roark, Binney, and Wiebe were raided by armed FBI agents. According to Mayer, Binney claims the FBI pointed guns at his head and that of his wife. Wiebe said it reminded him of the Soviet Union. None of these people were ever charged with any crime. Four months later, Drake was raided in November 2007 and his computers and documents were confiscated.

In 2010 Drake was indicted by the U.S. Department of Justice on charges of obstructing justice, providing false information, and violating the Espionage Act of 1917, part of President Barack Obama's crackdown on whistleblowers and "leakers". The government tried to get Roark to testify to a conspiracy, and made similar requests to Drake, offering him a plea bargain. They both refused.

In June 2011, the ten original charges against Drake were dropped; instead he pleaded guilty to a misdemeanor.

== See also ==
- Mark Klein
- Edward Snowden
- Thomas Tamm
- Russ Tice
- Information Awareness Office
- Main Core
- NSA Call Database
- Hepting v. AT&T
- Cabinet noir
- Room 641A
- ECHELON
- Project Shamrock, DCSNet and Red Hook (FBI)
- Communications Assistance For Law Enforcement Act
- Telecommunications data retention
- Mass surveillance
- The First Circle, Alexander Solzhenytsin

== Gorman's Baltimore Sun series ==
- Little-known contractor has close ties with staff of NSA January 29, 2006
- System Error, January 29, 2006
- GAO head stymied in quest to audit anti-terror efforts, February 4, 2006
- Computer ills hinder NSA, February 26, 2006
- Freshly briefed lawmakers to question Hayden today, May 18, 2006, with Gwyneth K. Shaw
- Second-ranking NSA official forced out of job by director May 31, 2006
