= Michael Hayden (general) =

American general (born 1945)

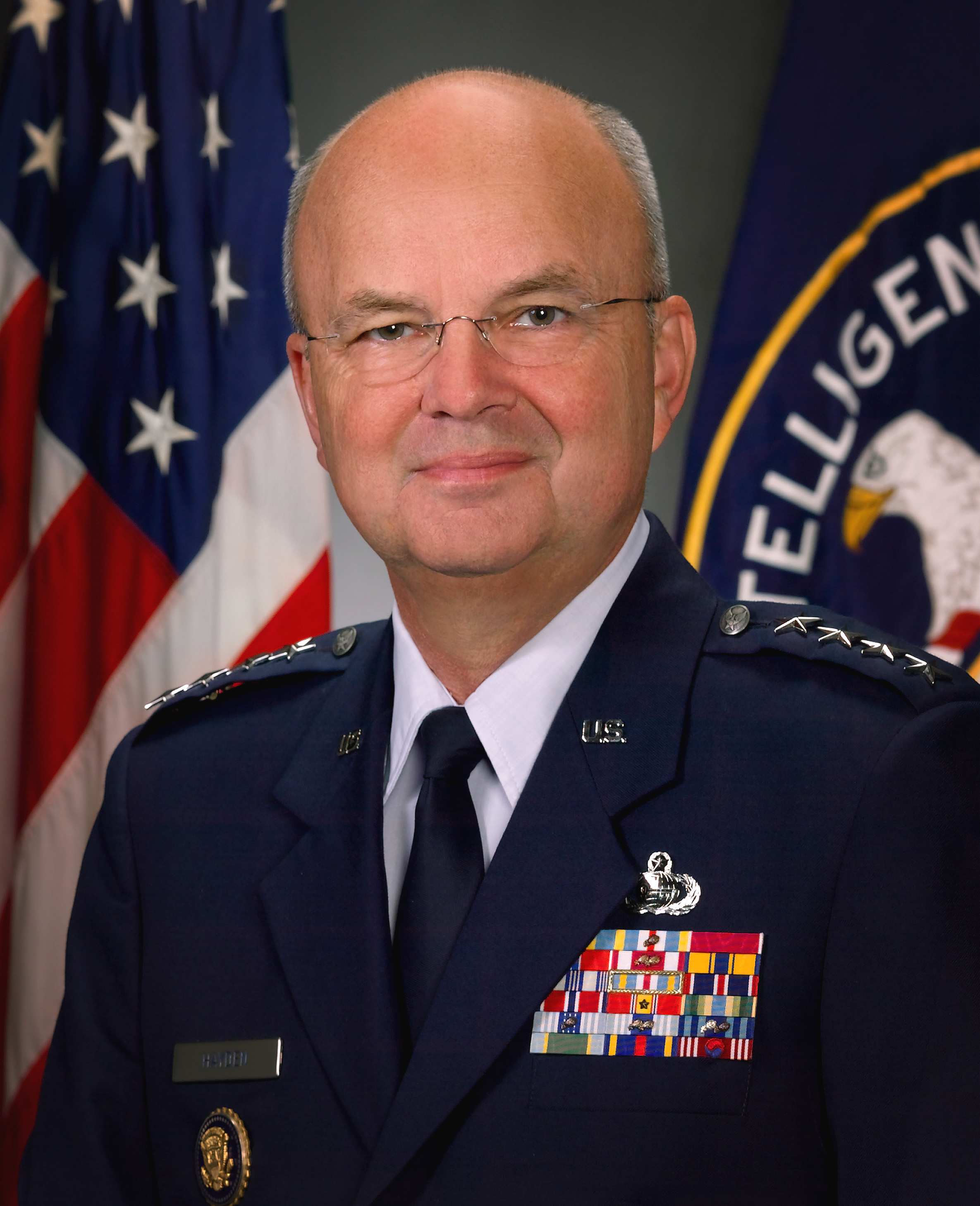
- Official portrait, 2006

2nd Director of the Central Intelligence Agency
- In office May 30, 2006 – February 12, 2009
- President: George W. Bush; Barack Obama
- Deputy: Albert M. Calland III; Stephen Kappes
- Preceded by: Porter Goss
- Succeeded by: Leon Panetta

1st Principal Deputy Director of National Intelligence
- In office April 21, 2005 – May 30, 2006
- President: George W. Bush
- Preceded by: Position established
- Succeeded by: Ronald L. Burgess Jr. (acting)

15th Director of the National Security Agency
- In office March 21, 1999 – April 21, 2005
- President: Bill Clinton; George W. Bush
- Preceded by: Kenneth Minihan
- Succeeded by: Keith Alexander

Personal details
- Born: Michael Vincent Hayden; March 17, 1945 (age 81) Pittsburgh, Pennsylvania, U.S.
- Spouse: Jeanine Carrier
- Children: 3
- Education: Duquesne University (BA, MA)

Military service
- Allegiance: United States
- Branch/service: United States Air Force
- Years of service: 1967–2008
- Rank: General
- Commands: Air Intelligence Agency
- Battles/wars: War on terror
- Awards: Defense Distinguished Service Medal (3); Defense Superior Service Medal (2); Legion of Merit; Bronze Star Medal; Meritorious Service Medal (3)
- Hayden's voice Hayden speaks on NATO contributions to the war in Afghanistan; Recorded November 15, 2006

Michael Vincent Hayden (born March 17, 1945) is a retired United States Air Force four-star general and former director of the National Security Agency, Principal Deputy Director of National Intelligence, and Director of the Central Intelligence Agency. He currently works as a visiting professor at the George Mason University – Schar School of Policy and Government and co-chairs the Bipartisan Policy Center's Electric Grid Cyber Security Initiative.

Hayden was director of the National Security Agency (NSA) from 1999 to 2005. In this role, he initiated and oversaw the NSA surveillance of digital communications between persons in the United States and foreign citizens who allegedly had ties to terrorist groups, which resulted in the NSA warrantless surveillance. On April 21, 2005, then Lt. Gen Hayden was confirmed by the United States Senate as the first Principal Deputy Director of National Intelligence (DNI) and awarded his fourth star, making him "the highest-ranking military intelligence officer in the armed forces".

On May 26, 2006, Hayden was appointed as Director of the Central Intelligence Agency. He retired from the Air Force in April 2008, after 41 years of service, while continuing to serve as Director of the CIA until February 12, 2009.

== Early life and education ==
Michael Vincent Hayden was born on March 17, 1945, in Pittsburgh, Pennsylvania, to an Irish-American couple, Sadie (Murray) and Harry V. Hayden Jr., who worked as a welder for a Pennsylvania manufacturing company. He has a sister, Debby, and a brother, Harry. Hayden attended St. Peter's Elementary School where, in 7th and 8th grade he played quarterback on the school football team and was coached by the late Dan Rooney, the son of the founder of the Pittsburgh Steelers. Hayden graduated from North Catholic High School. One of his first jobs was as an equipment manager for the Steelers. He went on to Duquesne University in Pittsburgh, where he earned a Bachelor of Arts in history in 1967 and was commissioned as a second lieutenant. He then attended graduate school at Duquesne for a master's degree in modern American history. Hayden was commissioned through Duquesne University's Air Force Reserve Officers' Training Corps program, and entered active military service in 1969.

== Career ==
Hayden worked at the U.S. Embassy in the then-People's Republic of Bulgaria and in intelligence in Guam. He served on the National Security Council, Washington, D.C. and in senior staff positions for Pentagon, U.S. European Command headquarters in Stuttgart, and then as deputy chief of staff for the United Nations Command and U.S. Forces Korea, Yongsan Garrison. The general served as director of the Joint Command and Control Warfare Center, at Lackland Air Force Base. From 1996 to 1997, Hayden remained at Lackland Air Force Base in San Antonio, as commander of the Air Force Intelligence, Surveillance and Reconnaissance Agency. AIA is staffed by 16,000 personnel charged with defending and exploiting the "information domain".

=== National Security Agency ===
In February 1999 Hayden was nominated by President Bill Clinton be the director of the NSA and chief of the Central Security Service at Fort George G. Meade, Maryland. He served in that capacity from March 1999 to April 2005. As the director of NSA and chief of CSS, he was responsible for a combat support agency of the Department of Defense with military and civilian personnel stationed worldwide.

==== Strategy for the NSA ====
Hayden came to the NSA at a time of upheaval in the agency. Internal government analysis indicated it suffered from a lack of quality management and outdated IT infrastructure. Soon after he came on board, a huge part of the NSA network system crashed and was down for several days. Part of his plan to revitalize the agency was to introduce more outside contractors, convince older managers to retire, and generally overhaul management structures. He also wanted to increase openness at the agency, as it had historically been one of the most secretive organs of government. He even allowed James Bamford access for his book Body of Secrets. Initially, Hayden was extremely concerned with following laws against domestic surveillance.

On 9/11, Hayden immediately evacuated all non-essential personnel from NSA headquarters. After 9/11, the agency greatly increased its activity. Many reports say that after 9/11, Hayden became increasingly concerned with stopping terrorism, and allegedly softened his stance against domestic surveillance. Hayden said that he believed everything the agency was doing was "effective, appropriate, and lawful". Details about the NSA's operations have been largely hidden, but it played a major role in the wars in Afghanistan and Iraq and the war on terror. One notable example is the NSA's relationship with the unmanned aerial vehicle 'drone' program.

==== Trailblazer ====
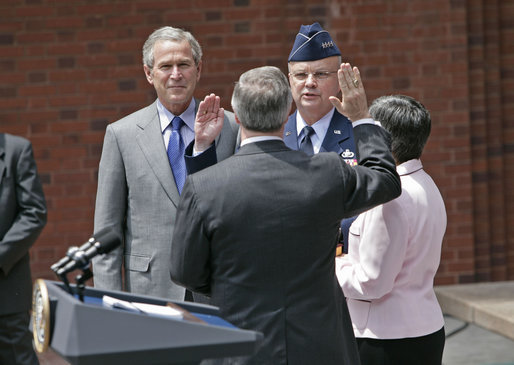
Hayden is sworn in as Principal Deputy Director of National Intelligence.

Hayden also championed the Trailblazer Project, a "transformation" effort to better apply information technology. The project was criticized internally by some NSA staff, for omitting privacy protections for United States citizens. Such omissions constituted a potential failure, subjecting the NSA to external critical feedback, including Diane S. Roark, of the House Intelligence Committee. NSA employees Thomas Andrews Drake, William Binney, and J. Kirk Wiebe voiced similar concerns. Hayden rebuked these NSA staff and several resigned in protest. After investigation by the NSA inspector general, the DOD inspector general, and Congress, Trailblazer was shut down.

=== Principal Deputy Director of National Intelligence ===
As part of the Intelligence Reform and Terrorism Prevention Act of 2004, the CIA director would no longer run the intelligence community. Instead, a new office was created for this purpose: the Office of the Director of National Intelligence (ODNI). General Hayden became the Principal Deputy Director of National Intelligence from May 2005 to May 2006 under the first Director, John Negroponte.

==== Civil liberties ====
On January 23, 2006, Hayden appeared at a news conference. A C-Span video was posted of Hayden telling reporters in attendance that "probable cause" is not required for all searches or seizures under the Fourth Amendment, claiming instead that the standard is whether the search or seizure is reasonable. "Probable cause" is required for all warrants, whether or not the search or seizure is deemed to be "unreasonable".

=== Director of the CIA ===
On May 8, 2006, Hayden was nominated by President George W. Bush to be Director of the Central Intelligence Agency after the resignation of Porter J. Goss on May 5, 2006. Hayden was confirmed on May 26, 2006, as CIA director, 78–15, by full U.S. Senate vote.

==== Wiretaps of domestic communication ====
In May 2006, USA Today reported that, under Hayden's leadership, the NSA created a domestic telephone call database. During his CIA director nomination hearings, Hayden defended his actions to Senator Russ Feingold and others. Hayden stated that he had relied upon legal advice from the White House, that warrantless surveillance would not have required a warrant from a FISA court. The stated purpose of the database was to eavesdrop on international communications between persons within the U.S. and individuals and groups overseas in order to locate terrorists. Critics of the Hayden's nomination and his attempts to increase domestic surveillance included Senator Dianne Feinstein who stated on May 11, 2006, that "I happen to believe we are on our way to a major constitutional confrontation on Fourth Amendment guarantees of unreasonable search and seizure".

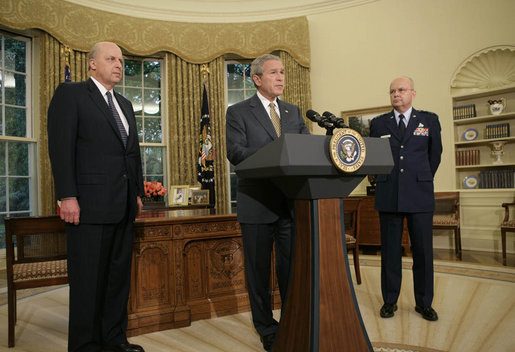
George W. Bush announces his nomination of Hayden as the next Director of the CIA as Director of National Intelligence John Negroponte looks on.

In 2007, Hayden pushed to allow the CIA to conduct drone strikes purely on the behavior of ground vehicles, with no further evidence of connection to terrorism. Hayden was accused of lying to Congress during his 2007 testimony about the CIA's 'enhanced interrogation program. Many critics of enhanced interrogation techniques maintain that they were torture and did not yield reliable information from CIA detainees. Hayden said the notion that enhanced interrogation never yields useful intelligence is not credible and is merely the opinion of "interrogation deniers". The 2014 Senate Intelligence Committee report on CIA torture cited an email indicating that as CIA Director, Hayden instructed that out-of-date information be used in briefing Congress so that fewer than 100 Guantanamo Bay detainees would be reported.

In 2008 Hayden warned of the destabilizing consequences of Muslim migration to Europe, and that it might cause mass outbreaks of civil unrest. In his memoir, Leon Panetta said that Hayden had hoped to be retained as CIA director by the Obama administration. Panetta was appointed instead. In conversations with Panetta, Hayden encouraged him to advise the president to protect the CIA's right to engage in enhanced interrogation techniques as well as to avoid suggesting that CIA officers had ever tortured terrorists.

=== Post-CIA years ===
In September 2013, Hayden stressed the indisputable legality of "what the NSA is doing" and called Edward Snowden a "troubled young man" and "morally arrogant to a tremendous degree". In December 2013, after the P5+1 reached a nuclear agreement with Iran, Hayden said, "We have accepted Iranian uranium enrichment." Hayden worked for a number of years as a principal at the Chertoff Group, a security consultancy, but left at the end of 2022. He serves on the board of directors of the Atlantic Council, and co-founded the Michael V. Hayden Center for Intelligence, Policy, and International Security. Hayden is currently on the advisory board of NewsGuard.

== NSA spying scandal ==
During his tenure as director, Hayden oversaw the controversial NSA surveillance of technological communications between persons in the United States and alleged foreign terrorist groups. Numerous commentators have accused Hayden of lying to congress, and breaking the law. Hayden misled Congress in his 2002 testimony, when he testified that any surveillance of persons in the United States was consistent with the Foreign Intelligence Surveillance Act (FISA); in fact, legislative branch statutes forbid warrantless surveillance of domestic calls unless approved by the Foreign Intelligence Surveillance court under FISA. In United States v. Moalin (2020), the U.S. 9th Circuit Court of Appeals ruled that the NSA program of mass surveillance of Americans' telephone records violated FISA and possibly the Fourth Amendment.

== Political activities ==
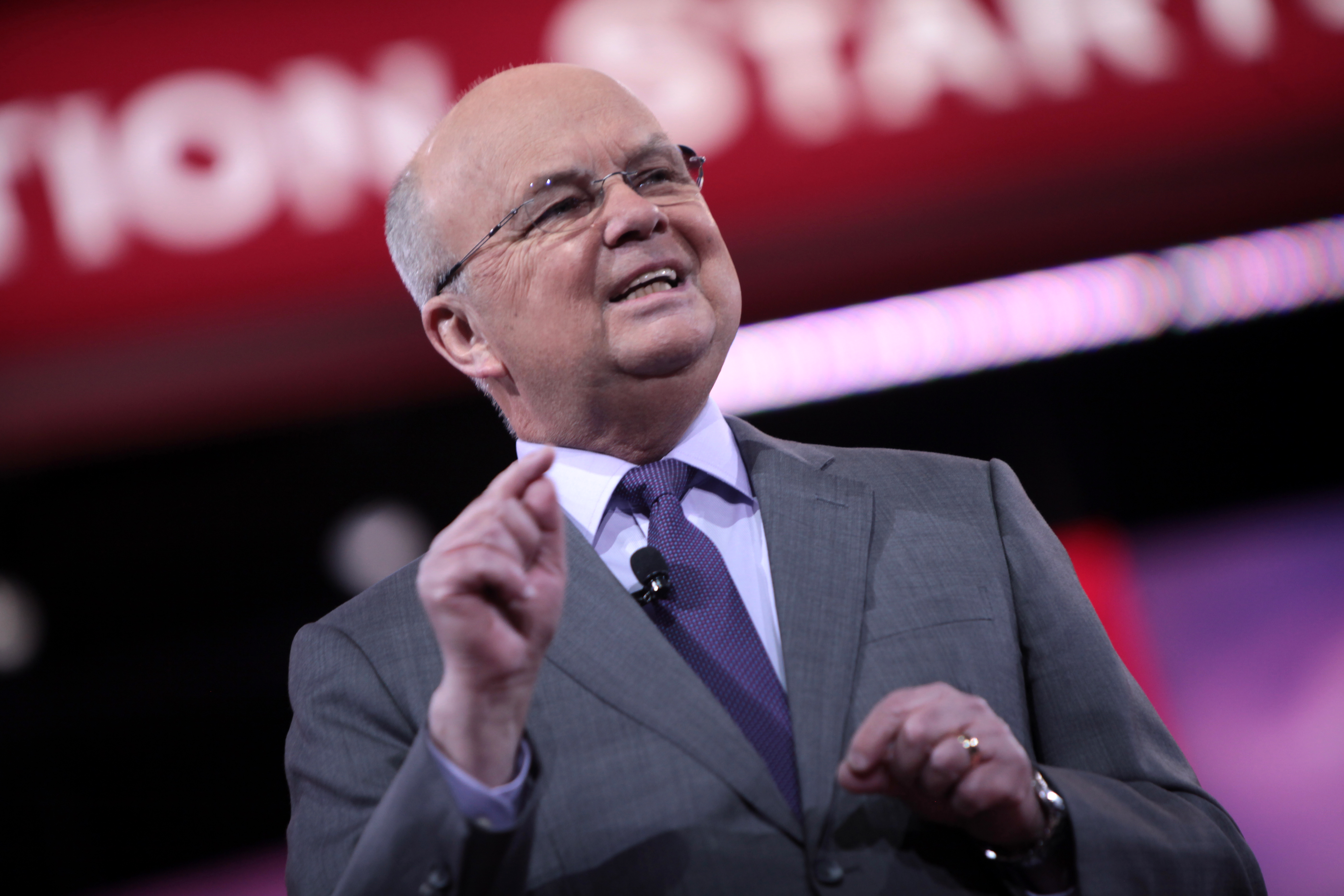
Hayden speaking at the Conservative Political Action Conference (CPAC) in National Harbor, Maryland, on 27 February 2015

On 20 August 2020, Hayden, a political independent, along with over 130 former Republican national security officials, signed a statement that asserted that President Trump was unfit to serve another term and added, "To that end, we are firmly convinced that it is in the best interest of our nation that Vice President Joe Biden be elected as the next President of the United States, and we will vote for him." In early October 2020, he endorsed Joe Biden in the 2020 United States presidential election. In response to a request made by future Secretary of State Antony Blinken, Hayden was one of the 51 former U.S. intelligence officials who signed an October 19, 2020, letter that said the Hunter Biden laptop story had "all the classic earmarks of a Russian information operation".

In October 2023, Hayden posted on social media that Senator Tommy Tuberville, who had been delaying certain military promotions in the Senate, should be "removed" from the human race. Hayden's comments were perceived by the news media as an apparent threat to and possible call for Tuberville's assassination. Later, Hayden appeared to double down on his comments on Tuberville being "removed" from the human race, saying that "MAGAnuts had lost their mind" over his Twitter posts. In reaction, General Michael Flynn said that Hayden should be arrested. Tuberville reported Hayden to the United States Capitol Police for the comments, saying that Hayden had called for his "politically motivated assassination". In January 2025, President Trump revoked Michael Hayden's security clearance.

== Personal life ==
Hayden is married to Jeanine Carrier. They have a daughter Margaret and two sons, Michael and Liam. Hayden continues to be an avid fan of his hometown Pittsburgh Steelers, traveling with his wife to several games a year. In November 2018, Hayden was hospitalized after suffering a stroke. He recovered but now suffers from aphasia as a result.

== Military career ==
=== Awards and decorations ===
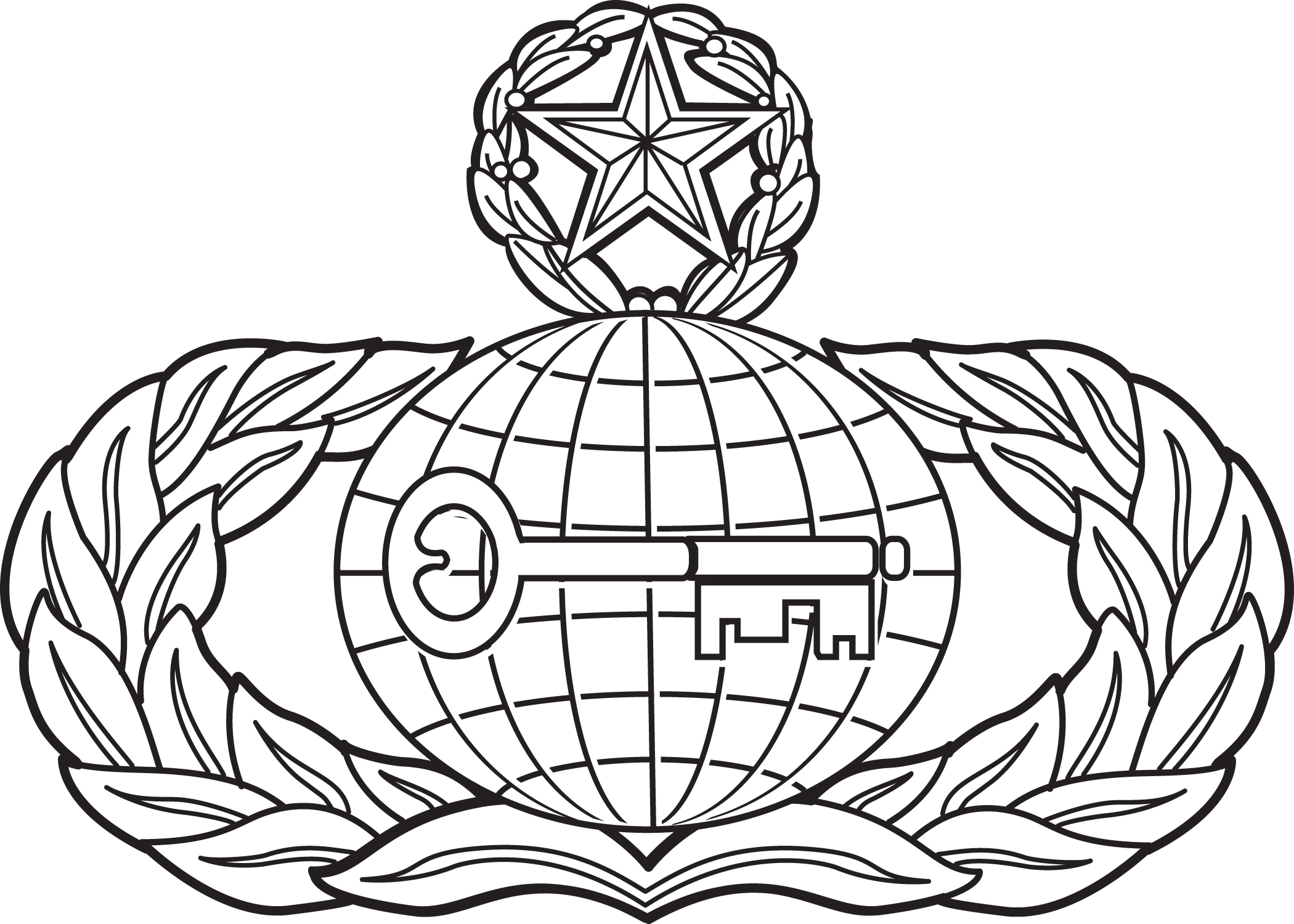
Master Intelligence Badge
Presidential Service Badge

| Defense Distinguished Service Medal with two bronze oak leaf clusters |
| Defense Superior Service Medal with oak leaf cluster |
| Legion of Merit |
| Bronze Star Medal |
| Meritorious Service Medal with two oak leaf clusters |
| Air Force Commendation Medal |
| Air Force Achievement Medal |
| Joint Meritorious Unit Award with oak leaf cluster |
| Air Force Outstanding Unit Award with "V" Device and two oak leaf clusters |
| Air Force Organizational Excellence Award with oak leaf cluster |
| National Security Medal |
| Distinguished Intelligence Medal |
| National Defense Service Medal with two service stars |
| Global War on Terrorism Service Medal |
| Korea Defense Service Medal |
| Armed Forces Service Medal |
| Air Force Overseas Short Tour Service Ribbon with two oak leaf clusters |
| Air Force Overseas Long Tour Service Ribbon with three oak leaf clusters |
| Air Force Longevity Service Award with eight oak leaf clusters |
| Air Force Longevity Service Award (tenth award) |
| Small Arms Expert Marksmanship Ribbon |
| Air Force Training Ribbon |
| Order of National Security Merit, Cheon-Su Medal (Republic of Korea) |
| Honorary Officer of the Order of Australia, Military Division (July 1, 2010, "For service to bilateral and international security relations between Australia and the United States") |
| Order of Merit of the Federal Republic of Germany, Commander's Cross |
| Royal Norwegian Order of Merit, Commander with Star |

Effective dates of promotion

| Insignia | Rank | Date |
|---|---|---|
| | General | April 22, 2005 |
| | Lieutenant general | May 1, 1999 |
| | Major general | October 1, 1996 |
| | Brigadier general | September 1, 1993 |
| | Colonel | November 1, 1990 |
| | Lieutenant colonel | February 1, 1985 |
| | Major | June 1, 1980 |
| | Captain | December 7, 1971 |
| | First lieutenant | June 7, 1970 |
| | Second lieutenant | June 2, 1967 |

=== Honors ===
In 2007, Hayden received the Golden Plate Award of the American Academy of Achievement. In 2008, in his native Northside neighborhood, the city of Pittsburgh named a part of a street going past Heinz Field in his honor.

On July 26, 2011, Hayden was inducted into the Air Force Reserve Officer Training Corps Distinguished Alumni in a ceremony at Maxwell AFB, Alabama, officiated by Lt. Gen. Allen G. Peck, commander, Air University. He serves as a member of the board of advisors of the Military Cyber Professionals Association (MCPA)

== Bibliography ==
=== Books ===
- Hayden, Michael V. (2016). Playing to the Edge: American Intelligence in the Age of Terror. New York: Penguin Press. ISBN 9781594206566.
- Hayden, Michael V. (2018). The Assault on Intelligence: American National Security in an Age of Lies. New York: Penguin Press. ISBN 9780525558583.

=== Critical studies and reviews of Hayden's work ===
- Packer, George (March 7, 2016). "Can You Keep a Secret? The Former C.I.A. Chief Michael Hayden on Torture and Transparency". Books. The New Yorker. Vol. 92, no. 4. pp. 67–69.

Playing to the Edge was one of The New York Times Book Review's 100 Most Notable Books of 2016.

Government offices
| Preceded by Kenneth Minihan | Director of the National Security Agency; 1999–2005 | Succeeded by Keith Alexander |
| New office | Principal Deputy Director of National Intelligence; 2005–2006 | Succeeded by Ronald Burgess; Acting |
| Preceded by Porter Goss | Director of the Central Intelligence Agency; 2006–2009 | Succeeded by Leon Panetta |
