= Diane Roark =

American whistleblower (born 1949)

- Born: 1949 (age 76–77); Oregon, US
- Education: Catholic University of America; University of Florida
- Occupation: Regulator
- Years active: 1981-2002
- Employer(s): Department of Energy, Department of Defense, National Security Council, U.S. Congress civil services
- Known for: Congressional committee staffer; whistleblower

Diane Roark is an American whistleblower who served as a Republican staffer on the House Intelligence Committee from 1985 to 2002. She was, right after 9/11, "the House Intelligence Committee staffer in charge of oversight of the NSA". In late 2001, Roark was informed by NSA official William Binney about the Bush administration's domestic surveillance programs, including Stellar Wind. Along with Binney, Ed Loomis, and J. Kirk Wiebe, she filed a complaint to the Department of Defense's Inspector General (DoD IG) about the National Security Agency's highly classified Trailblazer Project. Her house was raided by armed FBI agents in 2007 after she was wrongly suspected of leaking to The New York Times reporter James Risen and to Siobhan Gorman at The Baltimore Sun in stories about NSA warrantless surveillance. This led her to sue the government in 2012 for not having returned her computer, which they had seized during the raid, and because the government failed to clear her name. The punitive treatment of Roark, Binney, Wiebe, and Loomis, as well as, and, in particular, then still-active (rather than retired) NSA executive Thomas Andrews Drake, who had gone in confidence with anonymity assured to the DoD IG, led the Assistant Inspector General John Crane to eventually become a public whistleblower himself and also led Edward Snowden to go public with revelations rather than to report within the internal whistleblower program.

== See also ==
- Mark Klein
- Thomas Tamm
- Russ Tice
- Perry Fellwock
