= William Binney (intelligence official) =

Former U.S. intelligence official and cryptoanalyst; whistleblower (born 1943)

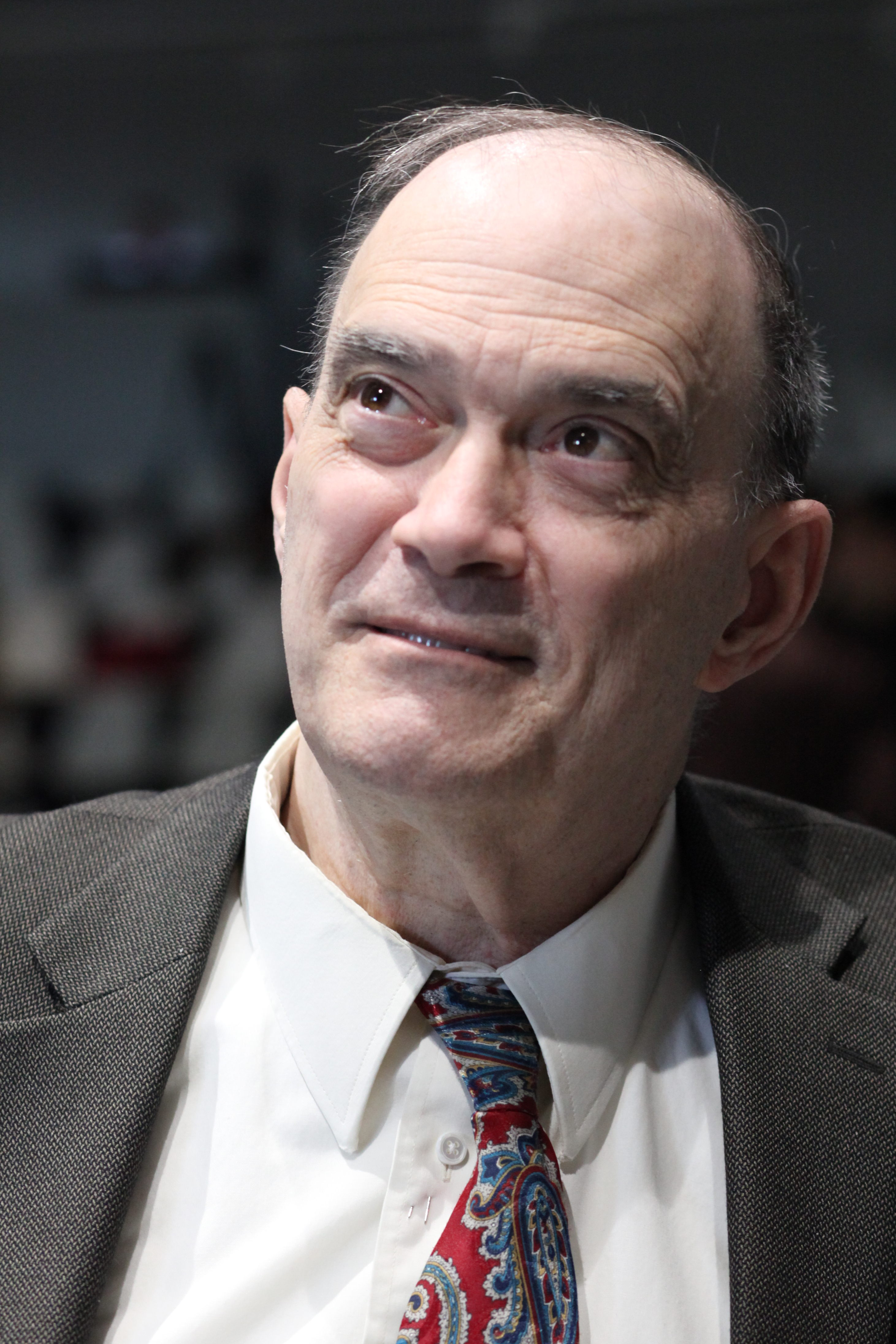
- Binney in 2013
- Born: William Edward Binney; September 1943 (age 83); Pennsylvania, U.S.
- Education: Pennsylvania State University (BS)
- Occupation: Cryptanalyst-mathematician
- Employer: National Security Agency (NSA)
- Known for: Cryptography; SIGINT analysis; whistleblowing
- Awards: Joe A. Callaway Award for Civic Courage (2012); Sam Adams Award (2015); Allard Prize for International Integrity (2019)

Signature
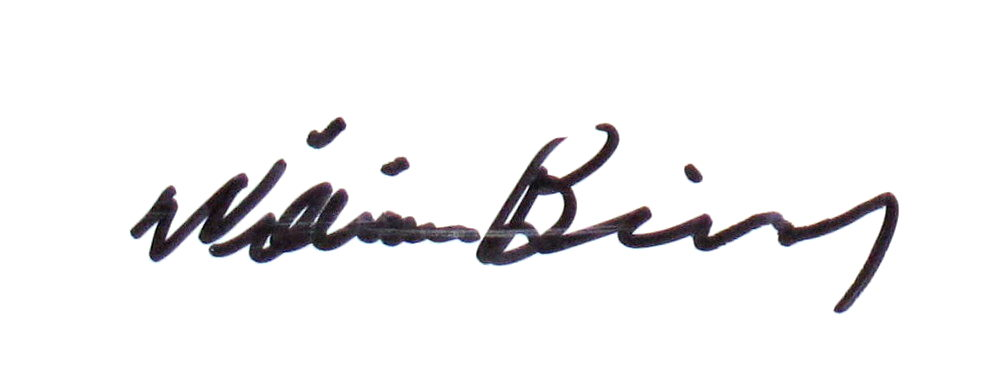

William "Bill" Edward Binney (born September 1943) is a former intelligence official with the United States National Security Agency (NSA) and whistleblower. He retired on October 31, 2001, after more than 30 years with the agency, where he served as Technical Director for intelligence.

Binney co-developed ThinThread, a signals intelligence collection program with built-in privacy protections that was shelved in favor of the more expensive Trailblazer Project. In 2002, he and colleagues filed a complaint with the Department of Defense Inspector General alleging waste and mismanagement. The FBI raided his home in 2007; he was never charged. His treatment, along with that of other NSA whistleblowers, influenced Edward Snowden's decision to go public rather than use internal channels.

Binney was a critic of NSA surveillance practices during the George W. Bush and Barack Obama administrations and testified before the German Bundestag's NSA commission in 2014. He received the Sam Adams Award for Integrity in Intelligence (2015) and the Joe A. Callaway Award for Civic Courage (2012).

In later years, Binney made disputed claims regarding the 2016 Democratic National Committee email leak and the 2020 presidential election. He initially attributed the DNC leak to an insider rather than Russian hackers, but after re-examining the evidence with journalist Duncan Campbell, stated there was "no evidence to prove where the download/copy was done."

He is a member of Veteran Intelligence Professionals for Sanity. He has been a frequent guest on RT and Fox News and has been frequently cited on Breitbart News.

== Early life and education ==
Binney grew up in Reynoldsville, Pennsylvania and graduated with a Bachelor of Science degree in mathematics from the Pennsylvania State University in 1970. He said that he volunteered for the Army during the Vietnam era in order to select work that would interest him rather than be drafted and have no input. He was found to have strong aptitudes for mathematics, analysis, and code breaking, and served from 1965 to 1969 in the Army Security Agency before going to the NSA in 1970.

== Career ==
Binney was a Russia specialist and worked in the operations side of intelligence, starting as an analyst and ending as a Technical Director prior to becoming a geopolitical world Technical Director. In the 1990s, he co-founded a unit on automating signals intelligence with NSA research chief John Taggart. Binney's NSA career culminated as Technical Leader for intelligence in 2001. He has expertise in intelligence analysis, traffic analysis, systems analysis, knowledge management, and mathematics (including set theory, number theory, and probability).

=== ThinThread ===
In the late 1990s, Binney led development of ThinThread, a signals intelligence program designed to analyze large volumes of communications data while incorporating privacy protections for U.S. persons. The system encrypted identifying information of Americans and required a court order to decrypt it, addressing Fourth Amendment concerns. According to a classified 2004 Pentagon Inspector General report, ThinThread's ability to sort through data in 2001 was far superior to that of another NSA system in place years later, and the report concluded the program should be launched and enhanced.

NSA Director Michael Hayden chose the competing Trailblazer Project in 2000, which lacked ThinThread's privacy safeguards. In September 2002, a consortium led by Science Applications International Corporation was awarded a $280 million contract to develop Trailblazer. The program was later deemed a failure and cancelled in 2006 after costing over $1 billion. Binney stated that ThinThread could have identified the September 11 plot from intercepts the NSA had collected but not analyzed.

After retiring from the NSA, Binney founded Entity Mapping, LLC, together with fellow NSA whistleblower J. Kirk Wiebe, a private intelligence agency to market their analysis program to government agencies.

=== Whistleblowing and FBI investigation ===
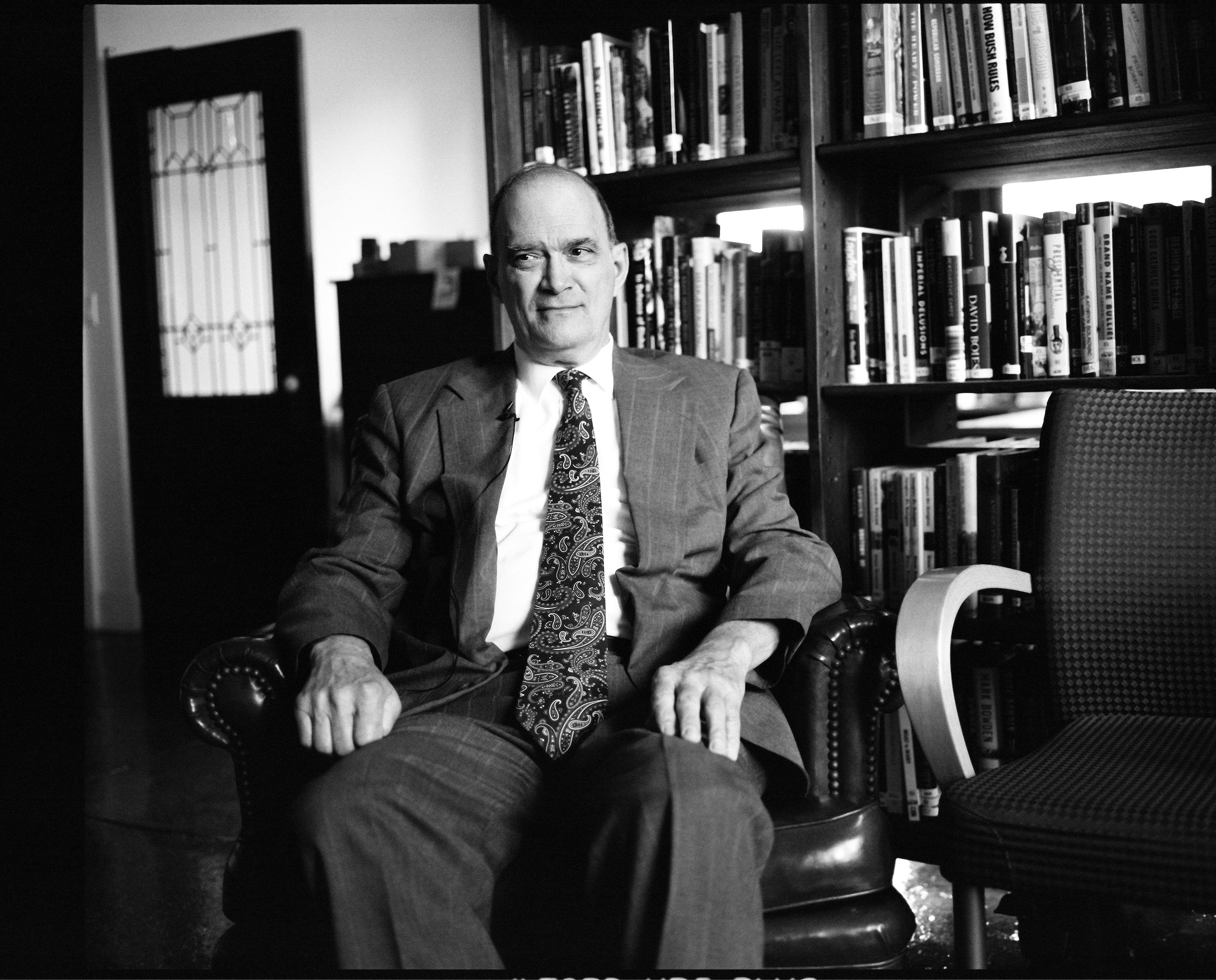
Binney sitting in the offices of Democracy Now! in New York City in May 2012, prior to appearing with hosts Amy Goodman, Juan Gonzalez, and guest Jacob Appelbaum

Binney resigned from the NSA on October 31, 2001, after more than 30 years with the agency. He was furious that the NSA had not uncovered the 9/11 plot and stated that intercepts it had collected but not analyzed likely would have garnered timely attention with his leaner, more focused system.

In September 2002, Binney, along with J. Kirk Wiebe and Edward Loomis, asked the U.S. Defense Department Inspector General (DoD IG) to investigate the NSA for allegedly wasting "millions and millions of dollars" on Trailblazer, a system intended to analyze mass collection of data carried on communications networks such as the Internet. Binney had been one of the inventors of an alternative system, ThinThread, which was shelved when Trailblazer was chosen instead. House Intelligence Committee senior staffer Diane Roark also participated in the complaint. Binney has been publicly critical of the NSA for spying on U.S. citizens, saying of its expanded surveillance after the September 11, 2001 attacks that "it's better than anything that the KGB, the Stasi, or the Gestapo and SS ever had," as well as noting Trailblazer's ineffectiveness and unjustified high cost compared to the far less intrusive ThinThread.

In December 2005, The New York Times published an exposé on the NSA's warrantless eavesdropping program. The FBI launched an investigation to identify the article's sources, at one point assigning five prosecutors and 25 agents to the case. The four individuals who had filed the 2002 Inspector General complaint—Binney, Wiebe, Loomis, and Roark—were targeted as suspects, although none of them were sources for the article.

Binney was cleared of wrongdoing after three interviews with FBI agents beginning in March 2007, but in early July 2007, in an unannounced early morning raid, a dozen agents armed with rifles appeared at his house, one of whom entered the bathroom and pointed his gun at Binney, who was taking a shower. The FBI confiscated a desktop computer, disks, and personal and business records. The NSA revoked his security clearance, forcing him to close a business he ran with former colleagues at a loss of a reported $300,000 in annual income. The FBI raided the homes of Wiebe and Loomis, as well as Roark, the same morning. Binney has said the raids were "retribution for our complaint against the NSA for corruption, fraud, waste, and abuse," and that the leak investigation was used as a "pretext."

Several months later the FBI raided the home of then-still-active NSA executive Thomas A. Drake, who had also contacted the DoD IG but anonymously with confidentiality assured. The Assistant Inspector General, John Crane, in charge of the Whistleblower Program, suspecting his superiors provided confidential information to the United States Department of Justice (DOJ), challenged them, was eventually forced from his position, and subsequently himself became a public whistleblower. Between 2007 and 2009, federal prosecutors attempted to indict the complainants three times but dropped the efforts each time. The punitive treatment of Binney, Drake, and the other whistleblowers also led Edward Snowden to go public with his revelations rather than report through the internal whistleblower program. In 2012, Binney and his co-plaintiffs went to federal court to retrieve the confiscated items.

== Statements and views ==
=== On NSA surveillance ===
Since leaving the NSA, Binney has publicly asserted that the agency collects and stores information about every U.S. communication. In a March 2012 interview with Wired magazine, he described the NSA's warrantless surveillance program, codenamed Stellar Wind, stating that at its outset the program recorded 320 million calls per day and included inspection of domestic email as well as phone calls. Binney alleged that the NSA's Utah Data Center, then under construction, was designed to store domestic communications for data mining without warrants.

NSA Director General Keith Alexander denied these claims before Congress in March 2012. However, documents leaked by Edward Snowden in June 2013 subsequently confirmed the existence of the PRISM surveillance program and other NSA domestic collection activities.

On July 3, 2014, Binney testified before the NSA investigative committee of the German Bundestag. He characterized the NSA's approach as "totalitarian," stating: "They want to have information about everything. The goal is control of the people." Binney told the committee that monitoring the entire population, both abroad and in the United States, was technically possible and in his view contradicted the United States Constitution.

=== VIPS letter on Ukraine ===
In August 2014, Binney was among the signatories of an open letter by Veteran Intelligence Professionals for Sanity to German Chancellor Angela Merkel, urging her to be "appropriately suspicious" of U.S. intelligence claims regarding alleged Russian military intervention in Eastern Ukraine prior to the September 2014 NATO summit. The letter stated that accusations of a major Russian invasion "appear not to be supported by reliable intelligence" and compared the claims to the "dubious, politically 'fixed'" intelligence used to justify the 2003 invasion of Iraq.

=== Russian interference in the 2016 election ===
Binney has said he voted for Trump in the 2016 US presidential election, calling Hillary Clinton a "war monger". He disputed the U.S. intelligence community's assessment that Russia interfered in the election, asserting that the Democratic National Committee emails were leaked by an insider rather than hacked by Russian intelligence.

Duncan Campbell said that Binney had been persuaded by a pro-Kremlin disinformant that the theft of the DNC emails was an inside job, and not the work of Russian agents (contrary to the findings of the US intelligence community). The disinformation agent altered metadata in the files released by Guccifer 2.0 (whom the US intelligence community identifies as a Russian military intelligence operation) to make it appear as if the documents came from a computer in the Eastern United States, not Russia. (Specifically, the local time zone of the computer's system clock was changed to UTC−05:00.) Binney appeared on Fox News at least ten times between September 2016 and November 2017 to promote this theory. In October 2017, Binney met with CIA Director Mike Pompeo at the behest of President Trump to discuss his theory.

According to Campbell, after reviewing the data, Binney stated there was "no evidence to prove where the download/copy was done" and that the Guccifer 2.0 files were "manipulated" and a "fabrication." However, Binney subsequently disputed Campbell's characterization, maintaining that his comments about the files being "fabricated" did not constitute a retraction of his overall position.

=== Role in apparent release of the Nunes Memo ===
In January 2018, Binney appeared on Infowars to discuss the then-unreleased Nunes memo. During the broadcast, host Alex Jones said that Binney provided him with “the actual memo they’re talking about” and incorrectly claimed that a document shown on air was the classified memo; it was actually an unrelated document that had been publicly available since 2017.

=== 2020 presidential election ===
In December 2020, Binney tweeted that the reported vote totals in the 2020 US presidential election were mathematically impossible, claiming that with 212 million registered voters and 66.2% turnout, only 140 million people could have voted—leaving insufficient votes for Biden's reported 81 million total. The claim contained a methodological error: Binney applied a turnout percentage for eligible voters (approximately 239 million people) to the smaller pool of registered voters, and relied on outdated registration data. The claim was amplified by The Gateway Pundit and retweeted by President Trump.

== Documentary film ==
Binney's story is recounted in A Good American, a documentary film.

== See also ==
- MAINWAY
- PRISM (surveillance program)
- Mark Klein
- Thomas Tamm
- Russ Tice
- Perry Fellwock
- Targeted surveillance
- Citizenfour – a 2014 documentary
- A Good American – a 2015 documentary
