= Stellar Wind =

Warrantless surveillance program of the NSA in the United States

2009 OIG Draft Report on Stellar Wind

"Stellar Wind" (or "Stellarwind") was the code name of a warrantless surveillance program begun under the George W. Bush administration's President's Surveillance Program (PSP). The National Security Agency (NSA) program was approved by President Bush shortly after the September 11, 2001 attacks and was revealed by Thomas Tamm to The New York Times in 2004. Stellar Wind was a prelude to new legal structures that allowed President Bush and President Barack Obama to reproduce each of those programs and expand their reach.

== Program scope ==
The program's activities involved data mining of a large database of the communications of American citizens, including e-mail communications, telephone conversations, financial transactions, and Internet activity. William Binney, a retired technical leader with the NSA, discussed some of the architectural and operational elements of the program at the 2012 Chaos Communication Congress.

The intelligence community also was able to obtain from the U.S. Treasury Department suspicious activity reports, or "SARS", which are reports of activities such as large cash transactions that are submitted by financial institutions under anti-money laundering rules.

There were internal disputes within the U.S. Justice Department about the legality of the program, because data is collected for large numbers of people, not just the subjects of Foreign Intelligence Surveillance Act (FISA) warrants. During the Bush administration, the Stellar Wind cases were referred to by FBI agents as "pizza cases" because many seemingly suspicious cases turned out to be food takeout orders. According to then-FBI Director Robert Mueller, approximately 99% of the cases led nowhere, but "it's that other 1% that we've got to be concerned about".

== 2004 conflict ==
From a report by the inspectors general of six US intelligence agencies that was declassified in September 2015, it became clear that President Bush had originally authorized the collection of telephone and e-mail metadata only if one end of the communications was foreign or when there was a link to terrorism. But in 2004, the Justice Department discovered that the NSA was apparently also collecting the metadata of purely domestic communications, after which President Bush declared that NSA had always been allowed to do so, but that analysts were only allowed to look at metadata related to terrorism. With this revised formulation, Bush reauthorized the program on March 11, 2004.

In 2004, the head of the Office of Legal Counsel (OLC), Jack Landman Goldsmith, wrote at least two legal memos authorizing the program, "We conclude only that when the nation has been thrust into an armed conflict by a foreign attack on the United States and the president determines in his role as commander in chief ... that it is essential for defense against a further foreign attack to use the wiretapping capabilities of the National Security Agency within the United States, he has inherent constitutional authority" to order warrantless wiretapping—"an authority that Congress cannot curtail", Goldsmith wrote in a 108-page memo dated May 6, 2004. In March 2004, the OLC concluded the e-mail program was not legal.

== Revelations ==
In March 2012, Wired magazine published "The NSA Is Building the Country's Biggest Spy Center (Watch What You Say)" talking about a vast new NSA facility in Utah and said, "For the first time, a former NSA official has gone on the record to describe the program, codenamed Stellarwind, in detail", naming the official William Binney, a former NSA code breaker. Binney went on to say that the NSA had highly secured rooms that tap into major switches, and satellite communications at both AT&T and Verizon. The article suggested that the supposedly-terminated Stellar Wind continues as an active program. This conclusion was supported by the exposure of Room 641A in AT&T's operations center in San Francisco in 2006.

In June 2013, The Washington Post and The Guardian published an Office of the Inspector General (OIG) draft report, dated March 2009, leaked by Edward Snowden detailing the Stellar Wind program. No doubt remained about the continuing nature of the surveillance program.

In September 2014, The New York Times asserted, "Questions persist after the release of a newly declassified version of a legal memo approving the National Security Agency's Stellarwind program, a set of warrantless surveillance and data collection activities secretly authorized after the terrorist attacks of Sept. 11, 2001," as an introductory headline summary with a link. The accompanying article addressed the release of a newly declassified version of the May 2004 memo. Note was made that the bulk of the program—the telephone, Internet, and e-mail surveillance of American citizens—remained secret until the revelations by Edward Snowden that, to date, significant portions of the memo remain redacted in the newly released version, and that doubts and questions about its legality persist.

== See also ==
- 2013 mass surveillance disclosures
- Hepting v. AT&T (warrantless wiretapping case)
- USA Freedom Act
- MUSCULAR
- NSA call database
- NSA electronic surveillance program
- NSA warrantless surveillance controversy
- President's Surveillance Program: Ashcroft hospital bedside meeting
- PRISM
