= Thomas A. Drake =

Former NSA senior executive, military veteran, and whistleblower (born 1957)

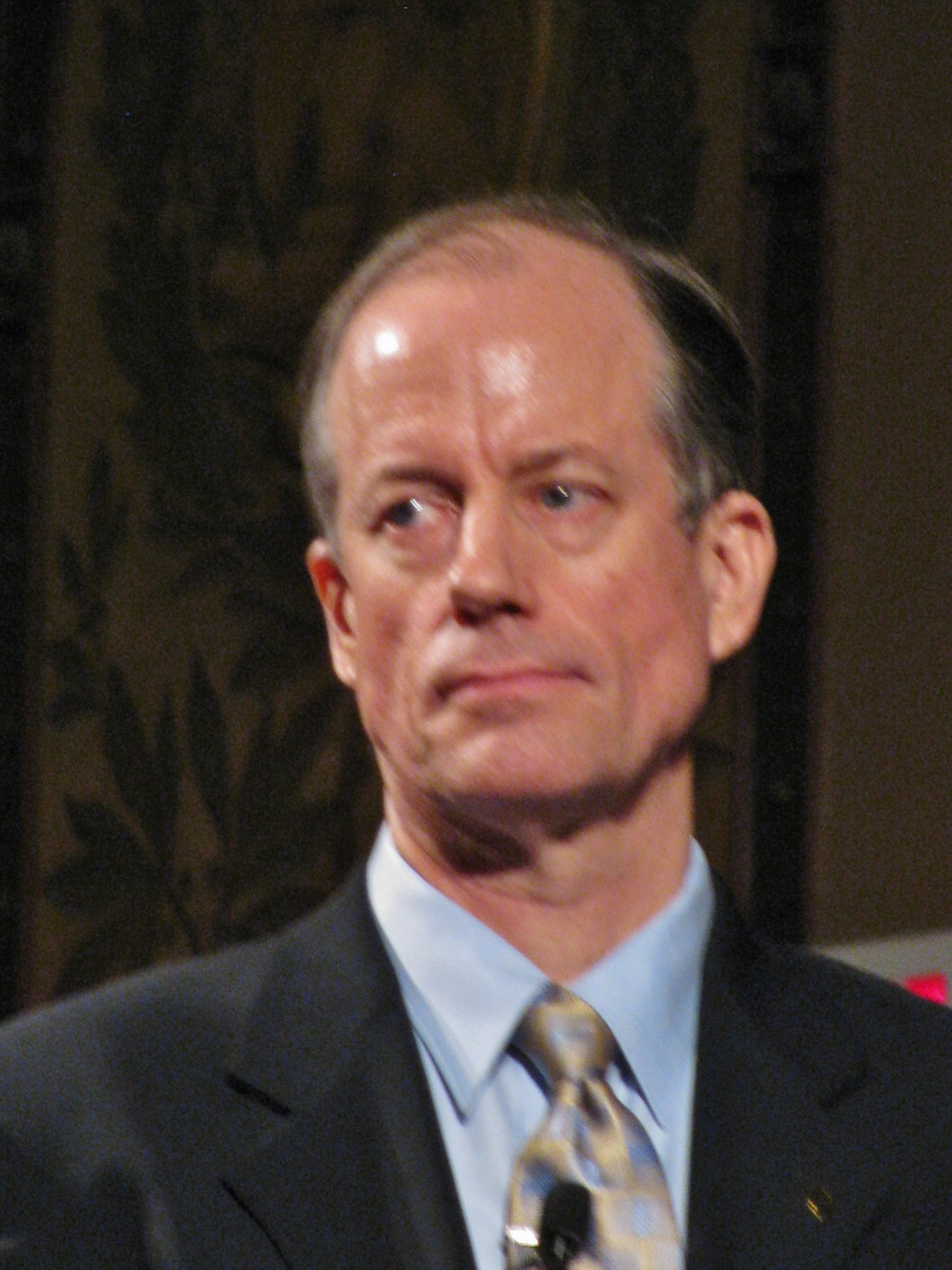
- Born: Thomas Andrews Drake; April 22, 1957 (age 69); Louisiana, United States
- Occupation: Former senior executive of the National Security Agency
- Writing career
- Notable awards: Military: Meritorious Service Medal; Air Medal; Air Force Commendation Medal; Civilian: Ridenhour prize Sam Adams Award; Hugh M. Hefner First Amendment Award

Thomas Andrews Drake (born April 22, 1957) is a former senior executive of the National Security Agency (NSA), a decorated United States Air Force and United States Navy veteran, and a whistleblower. In 2010, the government alleged that Drake mishandled documents, one of the few such Espionage Act cases in U.S. history. Drake's defenders claim that he was instead being persecuted for challenging the Trailblazer Project.

He is the 2011 recipient of the Ridenhour Prize for Truth-Telling. Drake and his attorney, Jesselyn Radack, are the co-recipients of both the Sam Adams Associates for Integrity in Intelligence (SAAII) award and the Hugh M. Hefner First Amendment Award.

On June 9, 2011, all 10 original charges against him were dropped. Drake rejected several deals because he refused to "plea bargain with the truth". He eventually pleaded to one misdemeanor count for exceeding authorized use of a computer. Radack called it an act of civil disobedience.

== Biography ==
Drake's father was a World War II veteran and his mother a secretary for Pearl S. Buck. He entered the U.S. Air Force in 1979, becoming an Airborne Voice Processing Specialist, with a fluency in German, and went on ELINT (electronic intelligence) missions. It was in that capacity that he encountered the surveillance state of East Germany and the Stasi, which informed his worldview and to which he compares developments in the United States since the September 11 attacks. Drake left the Air Force in 1989. He was also in the U.S. Navy, where he analyzed intelligence for the National Military Joint Intelligence Center. According to The Washington Post, he also at one time worked with the CIA. In 1989, Drake began work as an NSA contractor, evaluating software. As a contractor, he worked on projects like JACKPOT and LIBRARIAN, becoming an expert in the quality-testing of software and working on a system for measuring the quality of computer code at the NSA. Drake also continued his academic studies.

In 2000, he was hired as a software systems quality specialist and management and information technology consultant for Columbia, Maryland-based Costal Research & Technology Inc. (CRTI), a wholly owned subsidiary of Alexandria, Virginia-based Computer Systems Management, Inc. (CSMI). In late 2001, he went to work at the NSA as a full-time employee at the Signals Intelligence Directorate at Fort Meade with his actual first day on the job as an NSA employee being September 11, 2001. In 2002, he became a Technical Director for Software Engineering Implementation within the Cryptologic Systems and Professional Health Office. In 2003, Drake became a Process Portfolio Manager within NSA's newly formed Directorate of Engineering. He held a Top Secret security clearance. During the congressional investigations into 9/11, he testified about NSA failures. In 2006 he was reassigned to the National Defense University, where he became the NSA Chair and an Assistant Professor of Behavioral Sciences within the Industrial College of the Armed Forces (ICAF). Drake was forced to leave the NDU in 2007 when his security clearance was suspended, and he resigned from the NSA the next year. Drake then went to work at Strayer University but was forced from that job after his indictment of April 2010. He found work at an Apple Store. He then founded Knowpari Systems, a consulting firm.

In 2011, Drake was awarded the Ridenhour Prize for Truth Telling and was co-recipient of the Sam Adams Associates for Integrity in Intelligence (SAAII) award. Accepting the SAAII award he said, with references to an 1857 speech of Frederick Douglass:

Power and those in control concede nothing ... without a demand. They never have and they never will. ...each and every one of us must keep demanding, must keep fighting, must keep thundering, must keep plowing, must keep on keeping things struggling, must speak out and must speak up until justice is served because where there is no justice there can be no peace.

== Whistleblowing on Trailblazer and government response ==
=== Drake action within the NSA ===
In the late 1990s and early 2000s, the NSA desired new tools to collect intelligence from the growing flood of information pouring out of the new digital networks like the Internet. Drake became involved in the internal NSA debate between two of these tools, the Trailblazer Project and the ThinThread project. He became part of the "minority" that favored ThinThread for several reasons, including its theoretical ability to protect the privacy of US individuals while gathering intelligence. Trailblazer required billions of dollars, dwarfing the cost of ThinThread. Drake eventually became "disillusioned, then indignant" regarding the problems he saw at the agency. Around 2000, NSA head Michael Hayden chose Trailblazer over ThinThread; ThinThread was cancelled and Trailblazer ramped up, eventually employing IBM, SAIC, Boeing, CSC, and others.

Drake worked his way through the legal processes that are prescribed for government employees who believe that questionable activities are taking place in their departments. In accordance with whistleblower protection laws such as the Intelligence Community Whistleblower Protection Act, Drake complained internally to the designated authorities: to his bosses, the NSA Inspector General, the Defense Department Inspector General, and both the House and Senate Congressional intelligence committees.

He also kept in contact with Diane Roark, a staffer for the Republicans on the House Intelligence Committee of the U.S. Congress (the House committee responsible for oversight of the executive branch's intelligence activities). Roark was the "staff expert" on the NSA's budget, and the two of them had met in 2000.

In September 2002, Roark and three former NSA officials, William Binney, J. Kirk Wiebe, and Ed Loomis, filed a DoD Inspector General report regarding problems at NSA, including Trailblazer. Drake was a major source for the report, and gave information to DoD during its investigation of the matter. Roark tried to notify her superior, then-Chairman of the House Permanent Select Committee on Intelligence, Porter Goss. She also attempted to contact William Rehnquist, the Chief Justice of the United States Supreme Court at the time. In addition, Roark made an effort to inform Vice President Dick Cheney's legal counsel David Addington, who had been a Republican staff colleague of hers on the committee in the 1980s. Addington was later revealed by a Washington Post report to be the author of the controlling legal and technical documents for the Bush administration's warrantless surveillance program, typing the documents on a Tempest-shielded computer across from his desk in room 268 of the Eisenhower Executive Office Building and storing them in a vault in his office. Roark got no response from any of the three men.

=== NSA own inquiry and acknowledgement ===
By 2003, the NSA Inspector General (IG) had declared Trailblazer an expensive failure. It cost more than 1 billion dollars.

In 2004, the DoD IG produced a final report of its investigation that had been prompted by Roark and the others in 2002. The report basically agreed with their assertions and found very serious flaws at NSA. For a time, the NSA was even banned from starting projects over a certain size, for fear it would waste the money. However, there were no plans to release this DoD IG report to the public at the time.

=== Eventual whistleblowing ===
In a 2011 New Yorker article, journalist Jane Mayer wrote that Drake felt the NSA was committing serious crimes against the American people, on a level worse than what President Nixon had done in the 1970s. Drake reviewed the laws regarding disclosure of information, and decided that if he revealed unclassified information to a reporter, then the worst thing that would happen to him was probably that he would be fired.

In November 2005, Drake contacted Siobhan Gorman of The Baltimore Sun newspaper, sending her emails through Hushmail and discussing various topics. He claims that he was very careful not to give her sensitive or classified information; it was one of the basic ground rules he set out at the beginning of their communication. This communication occurred around 2006. Gorman wrote several articles about waste, fraud, and abuse at the NSA, including articles on Trailblazer. She received an award from the Society of Professional Journalists for her series exposing government wrongdoing. Judge Richard Bennett later ruled that "there is no evidence that Reporter A relied upon any allegedly classified information found in Mr. Drake's house in her articles".

=== 2007 FBI raids ===
In July 2007, armed FBI agents raided the homes of Roark, Binney, and Wiebe, the same people who had filed the complaint with the DoD Inspector General in 2002. Binney claims they pointed guns at his wife and himself. Wiebe said it reminded him of the Soviet Union. None of these people were charged with any crimes. In November 2007, there was a raid on Drake's residence. His computers, documents, and books were confiscated. He was never charged with giving any sensitive information to anyone; the charge actually brought against him is for 'retaining' information (18 U.S.C. § 793(e)). The FBI tried to get Roark to testify against Drake; she refused. Reporter Gorman was not contacted by the FBI.

Drake initially cooperated with the investigation, telling the FBI about the alleged illegality of the NSA's activities. The government created a 'draft indictment' of Drake, prepared by prosecutor Steven Tyrrell. It listed charges as "disclosing classified information to a newspaper reporter and for conspiracy". Diane Roark, Binney, Wiebe, and Loomis (the complainants to the DoD IG in 2002) were also allegedly listed as "unindicted co-conspirators". In 2009 a new prosecutor, William Welch II, came on the case and changed the indictment. Some charges were removed, as was any naming of 'co-conspirators'. The new case only contained charges against Drake.

Prosecutors wanted Drake to plead guilty, but he refused. He believed that he was innocent of the charges against him. The government wanted him to help prosecute the other whistleblowers. He refused this as well. He later explained his motivations to the Ridenhour Prizes organization: "I did what I did because I am rooted in the faith that my duty was to the American people ... I knew that you did not spy on Americans and that we were accountable for spending American taxpayer monies wisely."

=== Indictment ===
In April 2010, Drake was indicted by a Baltimore grand jury on the following charges:

- Willful Retention of National Defense Information 18 U.S.C. § 793(e) (5 counts)
  - (793(e) is a modification of the Espionage Act of 1917 made under the McCarran Internal Security Act of 1950)
- Obstructing justice 18 U.S.C. § 1519 (1 count)
- Making a False Statement 18 U.S.C. § 1001(a) (4 counts)

The indictment contained many other allegations, but most of them did not relate to the actual charges against him. He was not specifically charged with unauthorized disclosure of classified information, nor was he charged under 18 U.S.C. § 798, the "SIGINT" statute. The indictment gave details about his communications with Roark and with Gorman, but he was not charged with any crime directly relating to those communications. The indictment also did not list the names of Gorman or Roark, but they were confirmed by reporters (e.g. Mark Hosenball of Newsweek). Roark's lawyer claimed that the indictment contains a "mischaracterization of the facts" about the relationship between her client and Drake. Roark herself later spoke out in support of Drake and the other whistleblowers of the Trailblazer project.

The "willful retention" charges regarded five documents allegedly "related to the national defense" that were found at Drake's residence. The five documents in question were referred to as "What a Success", "the Regular Meetings", "Volume is our Friend", "Trial and Testing", and "Collections Sites". "What a Success" was declassified a few months after Drake was indicted, and should never have been classified in the first place, according to an official complaint filed by J. William Leonard, a former director of the Information Security Oversight Office. "Regular Meetings" was marked "UNCLASSIFIED" and posted on NSANet but prosecution argues the defendant should have known it was really classified. Drake's team also argued that the latter three of the five named documents were part of a collection of thousands of unclassified papers related to the DoD Inspector General Report (mentioned above). Drake's defense attorneys argued this meant that the defendant brought home the material accidentally, not "willfully."

The obstruction charge was related to Drake allegedly deleting documents while he was purportedly aware that the FBI was investigating leaks to the media, and that the FBI was contemplating investigating leaks to Siobhan Gorman of The Baltimore Sun. The false statements charge was filed in relation to the FBI's questioning of Drake without a lawyer present in the initial stages of the investigation when he was cooperating with them. One count is for alleged statements made by him regarding whether he had willfully taken certain documents home. Another count is for allegedly lying about the purported transmission of classified information to Gorman. Drake's defenders point out that the government's own expert found that he had not destroyed any evidence. They also point out that Drake was careful not to give any classified information to Gorman, and that many of the documents in question were 'retroactively classified' after they were seized from his home by the FBI.

The federal offices involved in filing the indictment included the DOJ Public Integrity Section, DOJ Criminal Division, DOJ National Security Division, the FBI, and the NSA Office of Security & Counterintelligence. Drake was represented by James Wyda and Deborah Boardman, federal public defenders.

Drake was also a client of the Government Accountability Project, a whistleblower non-profit. Jesselyn Radack, director of Homeland Security and Human Rights for GAP, worked with Drake. Author and NSA authority James Bamford was a consultant for Drake's defense as well.

Government prosecutor William M. Welch II, who had previously been charged with contempt and removed from the Ted Stevens case, served as the government's initial Senior Litigation Counsel, John P. Pearson of the DOJ Public Integrity Section was the government's Trial Attorney, and Lanny A. Breuer was in charge of overseeing the prosecution.

Federal Judge Richard D. Bennett was responsible for hearing handling the case, and initially set trial for June 2011.

The Drake case has been written about in The Washington Post, The New York Times, Agence France-Press, Newsweek, Wired, the Washingtonian.com, the Federation of American Scientists' Secrecy News, Politico, and elsewhere. Jesselyn Radack, of the Government Accountability Project, has also discussed the case.

The U.S. government publicly stated that the prosecution of Thomas Drake was not intended to deter government employees from reporting problems. "Whistle-blowers are the key to many, many department investigations—we don't retaliate against them, we encourage them", a spokesman for the Justice Department said. "This indictment was brought on the merits, and nothing else."

==== Court proceedings ====
In the spring of 2011, the prosecution made several moves to restrict the normally open proceedings of a jury trial in a United States courtroom, as reported by Gerstein at Politico and others. This was done under the legal auspices of the Classified Information Procedures Act (CIPA), which attempts in theory to prevent the release of classified information during open trials. The prosecution also moved to use the controversial "silent witness rule," in which exhibits are hidden from the public by the use of "code words" in court. The government had only attempted to use the rule a handful of times previously; its legality has been challenged under the Fifth and Sixth Amendments. The government also moved to restrict cross-examination of witnesses, to restrict jurors from reading the Siobhan Gorman Baltimore Sun articles about problems with NSA and Trailblazer, and to prevent the defense from making arguments or introducing evidence to the courtroom about whistleblowing or overclassification.

In addition, the prosecution also had the court seal two exhibits the defense had already published in one of its public court filings, which listed various documents the prosecution would try to use at trial.

The prosecution argued that the CIPA also applied to non-classified information and attempted to have unclassified information presented at trial in redacted form only.

===== Government arguments =====
Referring to Siobhan Gorman's Baltimore Sun news stories, the government legally pleaded that the "newspaper articles are unduly prejudicial. The only purpose for the admission of these newspaper articles is to put NSA on trial." The prosecution also contended that it had no legal obligation to prove Drake's intent to harm national security, saying that it "does not have to prove that defendant intended to harm the country" under the specific part of the Espionage Act that Drake was charged with; 18 U.S.C. § 793(e). As for the 'overclassification' defense, the government argued that such a defense claim would be 'confusing to the jury' and thus irrelevant to the charges. The government also argued that any discussion at trial of the legal concept of whistle-blowing would likewise be irrelevant to the charges.

===== Final disposition =====
In early June, shortly after the May 22, 2011, broadcast of a 60 Minutes episode on the Drake case, the government dropped all of the charges against Drake and agreed not to seek any jail time in return for Drake's agreement to plead guilty to a single misdemeanor of misusing the agency's computer system.

At the July sentencing hearing the presiding judge, Richard D. Bennett of Maryland's Federal District Court, issued harsh words for the government, saying that it was "unconscionable" to charge a defendant, two years after his home was searched, with a list of serious crimes that could have resulted in 35 years in prison, only to drop the 10 counts of the indictment on the eve of trial. Expressing his "irritation" with the prosecution, Bennett also completely rejected the government's request for a $50,000 fine, despite the sentencing guidelines recommending a fine of $500-$5,000. He noted that Drake had been financially devastated, spending $82,000 on his defense, losing his $154,600 job at the NSA and his pension, and being fired from his university teaching position. He sentenced Drake to one year of probation and 240 hours of community service.

=== Since 2012 ===
Drake appeared on The Daily Show on August 6, 2012, to talk about the history of his case, and in September sent an audio message of support to CryptoParty.

On March 15, 2013, Drake spoke at a National Press Club Luncheon about the national intelligence community and its attitude towards whistle-blowing.

Drake inspired Edward Snowden to leak information on the NSA spying program PRISM in June 2013. Snowden went public rather than reporting within the system due to the reprisals against Drake (and other whistleblowers), which led the Assistant Defense Department Inspector General (DoD IG) in charge of the whistleblower unit, John Crane, to himself become a whistleblower when it became apparent that Drake's identity had been leaked by DoD IG to the Justice Department.

Drake has become an activist against the surveillance state, frequently giving interviews and speaking at events such as Restore the Fourth and Stand Up For Truth. One of the themes of his speeches and interviews is a "privacy exercise" as follows "Put your entire life in a box, your documents, bank accounts, your passwords, everything—and give it to a complete stranger—a fellow American for safekeeping. Would you do it?" he states that he has yet to encounter a "yes".

In a September 2013 interview, Drake reaffirmed his belief that the problems of the NSA are so chronic and systemic that the only solution would be to completely dismantle and subsequently rebuild the entire organization.

On July 3, 2014, Drake along with former Technical Director of the NSA William Binney gave testimony to the German Parliamentary Committee investigating the NSA spying scandal. He described the close cooperation between the NSA and the German secret service BND.

On November 10, 2015, Drake appeared on a PEN American Center panel at the Newseum about "Secret Sources: Whistleblowers, National Security and Free Expression."

In 2014, Drake supported the international launch of The Whistler founded by Eileen Chubb and Gavin MacFadyen.

In 2015, The Whistleblower Interview Project published Drake's contribution to the project.

== Espionage Act and whistleblowing ==
Drake is one of four individuals in the history of the United States who have been charged specifically with "willful retention" of "national defense" information under 18 U.S.C. § 793(e). Most prosecutions are for "delivery" of classified information to a third party—something that Drake was not charged with. This particular portion of the Espionage Act was created in 1950 during the Second Red Scare, as part of the McCarran Internal Security Act. Anthony Russo and Daniel Ellsberg were the first to be prosecuted for the "retention" of what came to be known as the Pentagon Papers, which Ellsberg gave to The New York Times, eventually resulting in another landmark Espionage Act case in 1971, New York Times Co. v. United States. The prosecution of Russo and Ellsberg was dismissed in 1972 because of government misconduct. The second prosecution was of Samuel Loring Morison in 1985, a Navy analyst who sold satellite photographs to Jane's Defence Weekly; he was later pardoned by President Bill Clinton. The third was the American Israel Public Affairs Committee case in 2005, United States v. Franklin, Rosen, and Weissman.

== Related media works ==
Drake was featured in a 2014 documentary called Silenced. It was nominated for an Emmy Award in 2016. Having an analogous theme as the Oscar-winning documentary Citizenfour, which portrays similar treatment of Edward Snowden, Silenced has been the official selection and recipient of several awards from multiple film festivals even before its release to major cable networks in March 2015.

Also in 2014, Drake's involvement with Thinthread, his subsequent indictment, etc., along with others associated with his activities (Roark, Binney, Wiebe, Loomis), and Snowden were featured in a PBS documentary, "United States of Secrets".

== See also ==
- Mark Klein
- Thomas Tamm
- Russ Tice
- Perry Fellwock
- Stephen Jin-Woo Kim
- Jeffrey Alexander Sterling
- Chelsea Manning
- Julian Assange
- Wen Ho Lee
- Reality Winner
