= Thomas Tamm =

American whistleblower (born 1952)

- Born: 1952 (age 73–74)
- Education: Brown University; Georgetown University
- Occupation: Attorney
- Employer(s): Washington County, Maryland public defender
- Known for: Whistleblowing at U.S. Department of Justice
- Father: Quinn Tamm
- Relatives: Edward Allen Tamm (uncle)
- Awards: Ridenhour Truth-Telling Prize

Thomas Tamm (born 1952) is a public defender in Washington County, Maryland. He formerly worked as an attorney in the United States Department of Justice (USDOJ) Office of Intelligence Policy and Review during 2004 when senior Justice officials responded to the warrantless NSA surveillance concerning eavesdropping on U.S. citizens. He was an anonymous whistleblower to The New York Times, making the initial disclosures which led to reporters winning Pulitzer Prizes in 2006.

Maryland agreed to drop ethics charges against him in 2009 relating to those disclosures, and the USDOJ announced it had dropped its investigation in 2011. In January 2016, the D.C. Office of Bar Counsel announced that it had brought disciplinary charges against Tamm relating to those events. Despite some controversy with respect to politicization of that office and similar charges being brought to silence attorney whistleblowers especially beginning in 2014, Tamm in March 2016 agreed to public censure by the District of Columbia Court of Appeals in order to allow him to proceed with his life and career.

== Early life and education ==
Thomas Tamm was born in 1952. He is the son of Quinn Tamm and nephew of Edward Allen Tamm, both high-ranking officials of the FBI and federal judges, and brother of another career FBI agent. In 1974, Quinn graduated from Brown University. He then graduated from Georgetown Law School.

== Career ==
After passing the bar, Tamm joined the state's attorney's office. After gaining additional experience, he joined the United States Department of Justice's Capital Case Unit, where he litigated death penalty cases. He eventually joined the Office of Intelligence Policy and Review, where he was liaison with the United States Foreign Intelligence Surveillance (FISA) Court.

=== Whistleblowing ===
A New York Times article on December 16, 2005 exposing the warrantless NSA surveillance for the first time was based on Tamm's initial tip-offs. Reporters James Risen and Eric Lichtblau won a Pulitzer prize for that reporting in 2006.

In 2007, FBI agents raided Tamm's house. on suspicion of his involvement in leaking the details, but it was not until 2008 – online on December 13 and then in the December 22 issue of Newsweek – that his role was confirmed and Tamm began speaking out publicly.

On April 26, 2011, after inauguration of President Barack Obama (who had criticized the program) and a lengthy criminal investigation, the Justice Department announced that it would be dropping its investigation of Tamm and would not file charges.

=== Media exposure (2012–2013) ===
On August 22, 2012 The New York Times published an Op-doc (a forum of short documentaries produced by independent filmmakers) produced by Laura Poitras entitled The Program. The producer characterized it as preliminary work that would be included in a documentary planned for release in 2013, as the final part of the trilogy based on interviews with William Binney, a 32-year veteran of the National Security Agency, who also became a whistleblower and described the details of the Stellar Wind project that he helped to design. Binney stated that the program he worked on, the facility being built at Bluffdale, Utah, had been designed for foreign espionage, but in 2001 was converted to spying on citizens in the United States, prompting concerns by him and others that the actions were illegal and unconstitutional, which led to disclosures.

On October 29, 2012, the U.S. Supreme Court heard arguments regarding the constitutionality of the amendments to the Foreign Intelligence Surveillance Act (FISA) that were used to authorize the creation of such facilities and justify such actions. The determination of the court was not unanimous in James R. Clapper, Jr., Director Of National Intelligence, et al., Petitioners v. Amnesty International USA et al., as Justice Breyer filed a dissenting opinion, with whom Justice Ginsburg, Justice Sotomayor, and Justice Kagan joined.

In December 2013, the Public Broadcasting System's Frontline documentary series interviewed Tamm concerning the FISA Court.

=== Bar discipline ===
In January, 2016, the District of Columbia Office of Disciplinary Counsel announced, first to the National Law Journal, that in December it had filed ethics charges against Tamm (a member of the D.C. Bar since 1978) as a result of an investigation that it claimed dated back to 2009, for violating the confidences of his then-client the U.S. Department of Justice. Whistleblower lawyers analogized this to the ongoing disciplinary case brought in 2014 upon a complaint by General Electric against Washington D.C. whistleblower lawyer Lynne Bernabei and Notre Dame Law School professor G. Robert Blakey for advising in-house counsel Adriana Koeck to make her disclosures publicly to a New York Times reporter, as well as to the U.S. Securities and Exchange Commission and federal prosecutors. In December, the 80-year old and retired Blakey agreed to accept similar unappealable discipline with respect to his advice to former student Koeck. Tamm's attorney said the Maryland Bar had investigated Tamm for the same disclosures in 2009, and decided not to press charges. On March 24, 2016, the National Law Journal reported that Tamm had agreed to accept censure by the D.C. Court of Appeals to resolve that disciplinary proceeding and allow him to continue his life and career, rather than face the prospect of many years of litigation before many courts.

== Awards ==
- 2009 Ridenhour Truth-Telling Prize

== See also ==
- Quinn Tamm (father)
- Edward Allen Tamm (uncle)
- List of whistleblowers
- Edward Snowden
- William Binney and Diane Roark
- Thomas Andrews Drake
- Mark Klein
- Russ Tice
- Perry Fellwock
- Hepting v. AT&T
- Room 641A
