= Russ Tice =

American intelligence analyst (born 1961)

Russell D. Tice
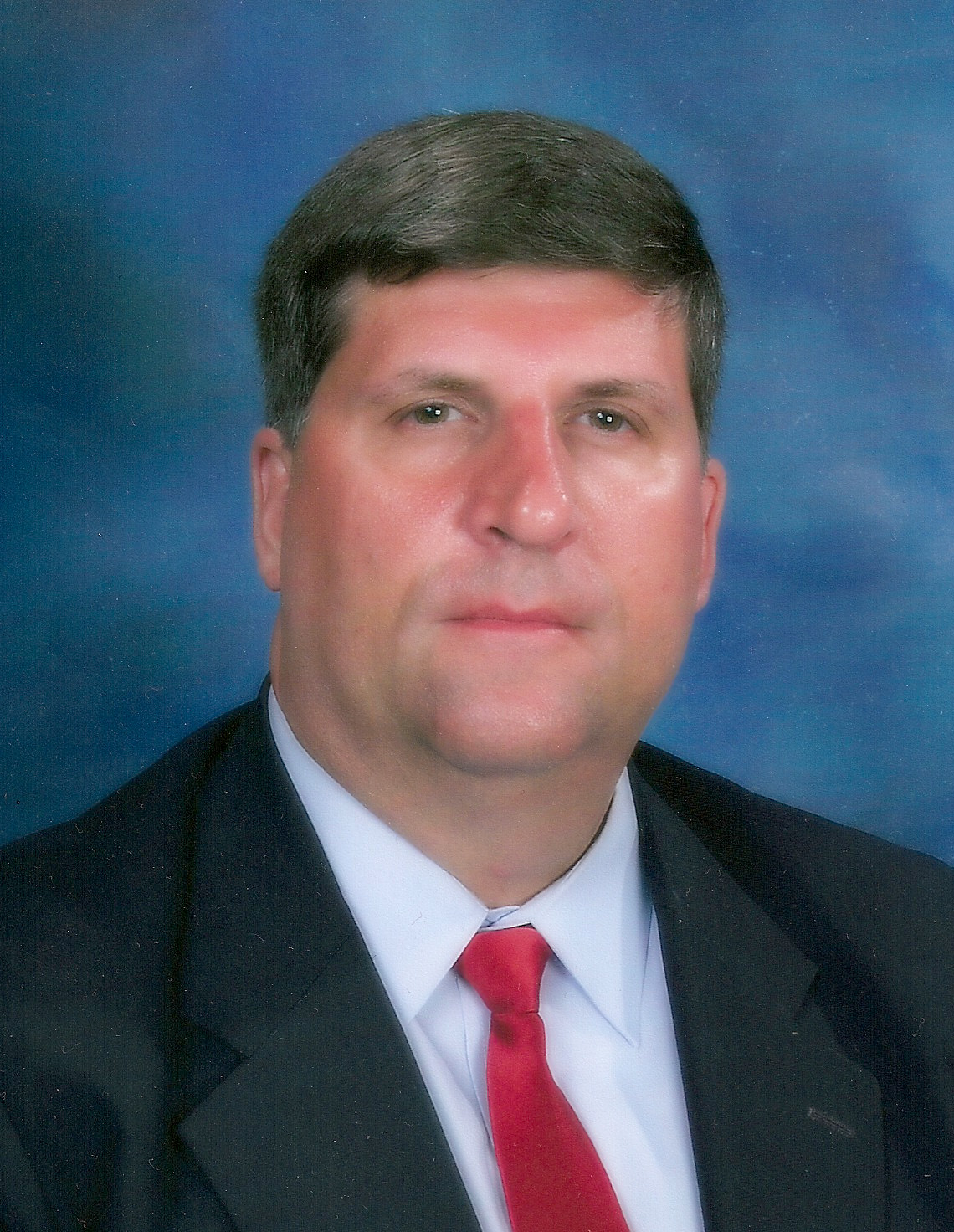
- Russ Tice in 2009
- Born: 1961 (age 64–65)
- Occupation: Intelligence analyst
- Employer(s): U.S. Air Force, Office of Naval Intelligence, Defense Intelligence Agency, National Security Agency
- Known for: Whistleblowing

Russell D. Tice (born 1961) is a former intelligence analyst for the United States Air Force, Office of Naval Intelligence, Defense Intelligence Agency (DIA), and National Security Agency (NSA).

In December, 2005, Tice helped spark a national controversy over claims that the NSA and the DIA were engaged in unlawful and unconstitutional wiretaps on American citizens. He later admitted that he was one of the sources for the 2005 New York Times reporting on the wiretapping activities. After speaking publicly about the need for legislation to protect whistleblowers, Tice received national attention as an NSA whistleblower in May 2005 before Thomas Andrews Drake, Mark Klein, Thomas Tamm, and Edward Snowden came forward.

== Career ==
Tice worked as an intelligence analyst for the U.S. Air Force, Office of Naval Intelligence, and Defense Intelligence Agency (DIA). During his nearly 20-year career with various United States government agencies, he conducted intelligence missions related to the Kosovo War, Afghanistan, the USS Cole bombing in Yemen, and Operation Iraqi Freedom. Tice was transferred from the Defense Intelligence Agency to the National Security Agency in 2002.

In April 2001 Tice reported his suspicions that an Asian-American woman he was working with was a Chinese spy, saying she had voiced sympathies for China, traveled extensively abroad and displayed affluence beyond her means. Tice was told his suspicions were unfounded.

After moving to the NSA, Tice continued to report his concerns. In April 2003, he wrote an email to the person at DIA handling his suspicions "questioning the competence of counterintelligence at FBI" and stating that he suspected he was being electronically monitored. According to Tice the DIA told him there was "reason to be concerned" about the female DIA analyst being a spy.

Shortly thereafter an NSA security officer ordered Tice to report for a "psychological evaluation", even though he had done so only nine months earlier. The psychologist from the Department of Defense concluded that Tice suffered from psychotic paranoia. In a statement written to the Inspector General, Tice stated that the psychologist "did this even though he admitted that I did not show any of the normal indications of someone suffering from paranoia". Tice said that three other psychiatric evaluations, including two at the NSA, showed he was normal and just two found him mentally unbalanced. Tice would later say that "I knew from that day that my career was over." Tice's security clearance was suspended and he was reassigned to maintaining vehicles in the motor pool for 8 months in what Tice considered "administrative punishment."

He had been nominated to receive a medal for work he had done during the Iraq war, but after his clearance was suspended it was withdrawn.

The Pentagon Inspector General's office investigated the NSA for possibly retaliating against Tice. A defense official said Tice seemed 'to have been punished unfairly' and that it appeared he had communicated "substantive concerns". Tice claimed he was "being retaliated against because [he] followed the rules and reported suspicious behavior".

== Whistleblower ==
Tice was dismissed by the NSA in May 2005, just days after publicly urging Congress to pass stronger protections for federal intelligence agency whistleblowers facing retaliation, and claiming that whistleblowers were being punished. In September 2005, the Inspector General issued an unclassified report that found "no evidence" to support Tice's claims.

According to Tice, claims that he had psychological problems are "bunk" and that 'that's the way the NSA deals with troublemakers and whistleblowers'.

In December 2005, Tice alleged that both (NSA) and the DIA were engaged in unlawful and unconstitutional conduct against the American people, sparking a national controversy. Tice stated that the activities involved the Director of the NSA, the Deputies Chief of Staff for Air and Space Operations, and the U.S. Secretary of Defense, and were conducted via very highly sensitive intelligence programs and operations known as special access programs (SAP), more commonly referred to as "black world" programs, or "black ops". Tice was a technical intelligence specialist dealing with SAP programs and operations at both NSA and DIA.

On December 16, the New York Times revealed that the NSA was engaged in a clandestine eavesdropping program that bypassed the secret Foreign Intelligence Surveillance Act (FISA) court. Media reports on January 10, 2006, indicated Tice was a source of the Times leak, which revealed that, under the direction of the White House and without requisite court orders, the NSA has been intercepting international communications to and from points within the United States.

In a letter dated December 18, 2005, to the Senate Select Committee on Intelligence, the House Permanent Select Committee on Intelligence, and to Senator Pat Roberts, Chairman of the Senate Select Committee on Intelligence, he said he was prepared to testify about the SAP programs, under the provisions of the Intelligence Community Whistleblower Protection Act. It is not known, however, what the testimony would specifically involve.

It has been assumed that the problem concerned the electronic surveillance of Americans, but in an interview published 13 January 2006, Tice said:

there's no way the programs I want to talk to Congress about should be public ever, unless maybe in 200 years they want to declassify them. You should never learn about it; no one at the Times should ever learn about these things. But that same mechanism that allows you to have a program like this at an extremely high, sensitive classification level could also be used to mask illegality, like spying on Americans.

In a press release issued by the National Security Whistleblowers Coalition on December 22, 2005, Tice explained the public aspect of his charges, stating that, "As a Signals Intelligence (SIGINT) officer it is continually drilled into us that the very first law chiseled in the SIGINT equivalent of the Ten Commandments (USSID-18) is that Thou shall not spy on American persons without a court order from FISA. This law is continually drilled into each NSA intelligence officer throughout his or her career. The very people that lead the National Security Agency have violated this holy edict of SIGINT".

On December 23, 2005, the Austin American-Statesman reported Tice's allegations that spying on Americans may involve a massive computer system known as ECHELON, which is able to search and filter hundreds of thousands of phone calls and e-mails in seconds.

On January 3, 2006, Tice appeared on the national radio/TV show Democracy Now! and said he wanted to testify before Congress. Tice said "I'm involved with some certain aspects of the intelligence community, which are very closely held, and I believe I have seen some things that are illegal".

On January 5, 2006, The Washington Times reported that Tice wanted to testify before Congress about electronic intelligence programs that he asserted were carried out illegally by the NSA and DIA. "I intend to report to Congress probable unlawful and unconstitutional acts conducted while I was an intelligence officer with the National Security Agency and with the Defense Intelligence Agency," Tice stated in letters, dated December 16, 2005 and disclosed by the New York Times.

In a letter dated January 10, 2006, Renee Seymour, Director of the NSA Special Access Programs Central Office, warned Tice that members of neither the House Permanent Select Committee on Intelligence, nor of the Senate Select Committee on Intelligence had clearance to receive the classified information about the SAP's that Tice was prepared to provide.

In reaction to Tice's claims, Rush Limbaugh and Bill O'Reilly, two prominent figures in conservative media, launched an offensive against his credibility. On his Fox News broadcast of January 11, 2006, O'Reilly said that Tice should be jailed for his whistleblowing activity. But Tice told ABC News that "As far as I'm concerned, as long as I don't say anything that's classified, I'm not worried ... We need to clean up the intelligence community. We've had abuses, and they need to be addressed."

On February 14, 2006, United Press International (UPI) reported Tice testified to the House Government Reform Subcommittee on National Security, Emerging Threats and International Relations that the Special Access Program might have violated millions of Americans' Constitutional rights, but that neither the committee members nor the NSA inspector general had clearance to review the program.

On May 12, 2006, ThinkProgress reported a story by CongressDaily in which Tice was said to be planning an appearance the next week, before the Senate Armed Service Committee, when further revelations would be made about "a different angle" of the NSA's surveillance program. Ultimately this did not occur and it is still unclear why.

On July 26, 2006, he was subpoenaed to appear before a federal grand jury regarding violations of federal law. He stated, "This latest action by the government is designed only for one purpose: to ensure that people who witness criminal action being committed by the government are intimidated into remaining silent".

On January 21 and 22, 2009, Tice appeared on MSNBC's Countdown with Keith Olbermann and stated that while he worked in the NSA, his role was to follow the communications of specific individuals in a program separate from the one that had been previously disclosed. Tice also stated that programs were given dual military and intelligence status so that both types of congressional oversight could be simultaneously denied. Tice said he initially understood that he was to identify the communication methods of journalists (and entire news organizations) so that they could avoid collection. He said it was difficult for him to communicate securely after he became a whistleblower since "I knew all my communications were tapped, my phones, my computer, and I've had the FBI on me like flies".

On the heels of the first Edward Snowden NSA disclosures in 2013, Tice was asked during an interview on All In with Chris Hayes, "What was your experience in trying to blow the whistle from inside the NSA? And does it make you understand why Snowden might have done what he did?" Tice replied,

Oh, absolutely. I learned the hard way, you cannot trust any of the internal supposed mechanisms that are there for oversight. The chain of command, the IG [Inspector General]'s office, even at the DOD IG I found was basically trying to put a knife in my back.

The Whistleblower Protection Act does not apply to the intelligence community. They're exempt from it. And most people in the intelligence community, they don't realize that. So, you can't even go to the Office of Special Counsel because they're exempt from that, too, and the merit system protection board.

So even if you use the whistleblower - intelligence community Whistleblower Protection Act, the only thing that gives you is the right to go to Congress. It doesn't - it doesn't have any teeth there to protect you against retribution from the agency that you're reporting abuse on.

Asked in June 2013 by The Guardian to comment on the early revelations about phone data collection by the NSA, Tice said: "What is going on is much larger and more systemic than anything anyone has ever suspected or imagined ... I figured it would probably be about 2015 [before the NSA had] the computer capacity ... to collect all digital communications word for word ... But I think I'm wrong. I think they have it right now."

Later during the summer of 2013 Tice alleged that during his employment with the NSA, the agency had a program that targeted the phone and computer conversations, word for word, of members of Congress, the Supreme Court, Admirals and Generals, and that the NSA had wiretapped Barack Obama while he was a Senate candidate, saying he had seen and held papers ordering such actions. Tice claimed the surveillance extended to lawyers and law firms, judges (one of whom, Samuel Alito "is now sitting on the Supreme Court ... two are former FISA court judges"), State Department officials, people "in the executive service that were part of the White House", antiwar groups, US companies and banking and financial firms that do international business, NGOs and humanitarian groups such as the Red Cross, and antiwar civil rights groups. In his opinion, this 'wide-ranging' surveillance could offer intelligence agencies 'unthinkable power to blackmail their opponents'. Tice said he was "worried that the intelligence community now has sway over what is going on".

== See also ==
- Hepting v. AT&T
- Room 641A
- William Binney and Diane Roark
- John Crane
- Perry Fellwock
