= Jewel v. National Security Agency =

US 9th Circuit Court of Appeals case (2011)

- Court: United States Court of Appeals for the Ninth Circuit
- Full case name: Carolyn Jewel v. National Security Agency
- Argued: August 31, 2011
- Decided: December 29, 2011
- Citation: 673 F.3d 902

Holding
- Citizens wishing to file suit against the U.S. Government for warrantless telecommunications surveillance must prove standing and personal injury.

Court membership
- Judges sitting: Harry Pregerson, Michael Daly Hawkins and M. Margaret McKeown

Case opinions
- Majority: M. Margaret McKeown

Laws applied
- Foreign Intelligence Surveillance Act, Fourth Amendment

Jewel v. National Security Agency, 673 F.3d 902 (9th Cir., 2011), was a class action lawsuit argued before the District Court for the Northern District of California and the Court of Appeals for the Ninth Circuit, filed by Electronic Frontier Foundation (EFF) on behalf of American citizens who believed that they had been surveilled by the National Security Agency (NSA) without a warrant. The EFF alleged that the NSA's surveillance program was an "illegal and unconstitutional program of dragnet communications surveillance" and claimed violations of the Fourth Amendment.

== Background ==
In 2006, journalists revealed a widespread warrantless wiretapping operation in the United States, in which government security officials worked with telecommunications firms to surveil the personal communications of citizens under the guise of protecting the country against terrorism. At about the same time, former AT&T engineer Mark Klein revealed that the company had allowed the National Security Agency (NSA) to install a NarusInsight surveillance system in its San Francisco switching center (Room 641A), which was capable of monitoring billions of bits of Internet traffic per second, including the playback of telephone calls routed on the Internet, and in effect spying upon the entirety of the communications of many American citizens and businesses who use the Internet.

== Litigation history ==
=== District court case ===
In 2008, the Electronic Frontier Foundation (EFF) initiated a class action lawsuit against the government on behalf of aggrieved citizens, with one named Carolyn Jewel volunteering to be named in the suit. The government moved to dismiss the suit because the plaintiffs could not prove direct personal injury from the surveillance, and thus lacked standing to sue, while the surveillance program itself could remain confidential under the state secrets privilege. The case was first heard at the District Court for the Northern District of California. Judge Vaughn Walker dismissed the suit in January 2010, holding that the plaintiffs lacked legal standing because their claims amounted to a "general grievance" against the government, with no evidence of direct personal injury.

The EFF appealed this ruling to the Ninth Circuit Court of Appeals.

=== Circuit court ruling ===
On appeal, in December 2011 the Ninth Circuit initially reversed the District Court's dismissal of the complaint and remanded the case back to the lower court to further determine the validity of the government's state secrets privilege claim. The case was thus returned to the District Court for the Northern District of California but with few new developments for about the next 18 months.

=== Subsequent district court actions ===
In the meantime, NSA whistleblower William Binney testified in July 2012 in support of the EFF, claiming that the NSA was "purposefully violating the Constitution". The NSA's mass surveillance program then became a matter of widespread public knowledge upon the revelations by Edward Snowden in June 2013.

In July 2013, District Court Judge Jeffrey White rejected the government's claim of state secrets privilege and allowed the EFF class action suit to continue, further holding that the surveillance program constituted a search process that in turn required a warrant for each search, per the requirements of the Fourth Amendment.

Later in 2013 the court ordered the NSA to explain the perceived impact of the recent Snowden revelations on the Jewel case and on its general national security efforts. In December 2013, the government again claimed the state secrets privilege and declassified documents detailing its process while reaching this decision. The NSA in the meantime was destroying the relevant records, because it was required under the Foreign Intelligence Surveillance Act to delete any such records after a proscribed period.

In March 2014, Judge White imposed a temporary restraining order, requiring the NSA to halt the destruction of evidence until a final resolution of the Jewel case. In June 2014, the EFF requested an emergency hearing requesting that the court enforce the temporary restraining order, after discovering that the government had continued the destruction of evidence. The NSA filed a counter-motion claiming that altering its process of deleting records and revealing the targets of its ongoing surveillance operation would have severe consequences "including the possible suspension of the Section 702 program and potential loss of access to lawfully collected signals intelligence information on foreign intelligence targets."

In February 2015, Judge White dismissed the latest motion by the EFF, accepting the NSA's argument that the requirements placed upon the agency would engender the "impermissible disclosure of state secret information." White also held that the plaintiffs did not have standing to pursue their claims. This procedural ruling allowed White to avoid addressing the constitutionality of the NSA's mass surveillance program.

Upon the disclosure of more information about the NSA's surveillance methods, the EFF filed another motion in May 2017 requesting that the agency disclose information about surveillance conducted against Carolyn Jewel and the other plaintiffs. Judge White granted this motion and ordered the government to hand over the information. However, the NSA filed a motion in opposition to that order, claiming once again that the plaintiffs lacked the standing to sue. After further arguments, the District Court accepted this argument in April 2019.

The EFF appealed that ruling to the Ninth Circuit. In a memorandum opinion, that court ruled in favor of the NSA, once again on the matter of standing. In June 2022, the EFF made a final request to the U.S. Supreme Court to take the case, but that court rejected the request and did not grant certiorari.

== Impact ==
The ultimate outcome of Jewel v. National Security Agency is that the U.S. government was able to avoid the Fourth Amendment implications of its mass surveillance program via procedural arguments about the need to keep its methods secret, while claiming that individual citizens cannot prove direct harm from the program. However, citizens have been unable to demonstrate standing because the NSA has argued successfully that the evidence needed for that task must remain secret, thus creating a Catch-22 situation. This has generated some criticism, because while the NSA's argument could possibly be justified under old evidence-gathering processes, the Jewel case did not address the much easier collection of personal information enabled by modern Internet and telecommunications technologies.

== See also ==
- Hepting v. AT&T
- Litigation over global surveillance
- Mass surveillance in the United States
- Room 641A
