= American Civil Liberties Union v. Clapper =

American federal court case

- Court: United States Court of Appeals for the Second Circuit
- Full case name: American Civil Liberties Union v. Clapper
- Argued: September 2, 2014
- Decided: May 7, 2015
- Citation: 785 F.3d 787

Holding
- Warrantless telecommunications surveillance is not permitted under the USA Patriot Act (later rectified by the USA Freedom Act).

Court membership
- Judges sitting: Gerard E. Lynch, Robert D. Sack and Vernon S. Broderick

Case opinions
- Majority: Gerard E. Lynch

Laws applied
- USA Patriot Act, USA Freedom Act, Fourth Amendment

American Civil Liberties Union v. Clapper, 785 F.3d 787 (2nd Cir., 2015), was a lawsuit by the American Civil Liberties Union (ACLU) and its affiliate, the New York Civil Liberties Union, against the United States federal government as represented by then-Director of National Intelligence James Clapper. The ACLU challenged the legality and constitutionality of the National Security Agency's (NSA) bulk phone metadata collection program.

The challenge was initially rejected in District Court, but that ruling was overturned at the Circuit Court level. However, this particular ruling later became moot when the U.S. Congress clarified NSA surveillance procedures in the USA Freedom Act of 2015.

== Background ==
The lawsuit arose in the wake of disclosures by Edward Snowden in 2013, revealing a system of global surveillance by the NSA and its international partners. In one particular revelation, The Guardian reported that the Foreign Intelligence Surveillance Court, at the request of the NSA, had ordered Verizon to hand over several months' worth of personal communications records for many of its customers. The phone numbers of both parties on a call were handed over, as was the call's location, time, and duration. The contents of the conversations were not covered in the order, but the metadata could be collected without a warrant under Section 215 of the Patriot Act.

The ACLU sued Director of National Intelligence James Clapper, NSA Director Keith B. Alexander, Secretary of Defense Chuck Hagel, Attorney General Eric Holder, and FBI director Robert Mueller, claiming that the NSA's mass surveillance program violated the First and Fourth Amendments, and particularly the warrant requirements of the latter. Specifically, the ACLU argued that collection of telephone metadata constituted an invasion of privacy and unreasonable search and seizure under the Fourth Amendment for Verizon subscribers, and that collecting the data could chill the free speech guaranteed by the First Amendment if people became reluctant to communicate due to a fear of government surveillance.

== Litigation history ==
=== Initial District Court ruling ===
The case was first heard at the United States District Court for the Southern District of New York. On December 28, 2013, Judge William Pauley dismissed the ACLU's complaint. Pauley ruled that phone users had no reasonable expectation of privacy for phone metadata, so a government search of that data did not require a warrant under the Fourth Amendment. This holding was based on the 1979 Supreme Court precedent Smith v. Maryland, in which it was determined that people who voluntarily give data to third-party telecommunications firms could not expect that data to be private. Pauley found no reason why Smith v. Maryland, which concluded that phone metadata was outside the expectation of privacy, would not apply to the NSA's program.

Pauley also held that the data collection was supported by the NSA's internal procedures that were in turn authorized under security-oriented statutes like the Patriot Act. According to Keith B. Alexander, the NSA did not perform any pattern analysis or automated data mining to extract additional personal information from every phone user's metadata, but it did need to collect that data to build a database from which individual pieces of information could be searched specifically with a warrant in the future. The court held that this technique was the least intrusive and most practicable method for the NSA's purposes.

Pauley was also convinced by the NSA's arguments that the metadata collection program was necessary for protecting America from terrorist attacks, citing purported success stories like the identification of Najibullah Zazi in connection with the New York City Subway bombing plot, Khalid Ouazzani in connection with the New York Stock Exchange bombing plot, and David Headley in connection with the Mumbai bombings and Danish newspaper bombing plots.

Pauley concluded that even though the privacy concerns raised by the surveillance program were "not trivial," the potential benefits of surveillance outweighed such considerations. Thus the NSA's surveillance program was found to be in compliance with the Patriot Act. In turn, Pauley avoided the Fourth Amendment considerations of the complaint.

The ACLU appealed this ruling to the Second Circuit Court of Appeals.

=== Circuit Court ruling ===
At the Second Circuit, the ACLU argued:

"The government has a legitimate interest in tracking the associations of suspected terrorists, but tracking those associations does not require the government to subject every citizen to permanent surveillance. Further, as the president's own review panel recently observed, there's no evidence that this dragnet program was essential to preventing any terrorist attack. We categorically reject the notion that the threat of terrorism requires citizens of democratic countries to surrender the freedoms that make democracies worth defending."

On May 7, 2015, the Second Circuit held that "the telephone metadata program exceeds the scope of what Congress has authorized and therefore violates Section 215" of the Patriot Act. Judge Gerard E. Lynch ruled that the "staggering" amount of information collected by the NSA was a violation of the Fourth Amendment and the Patriot Act. This immediately made many NSA surveillance techniques illegal. As a result, the District Court ruling was vacated and that court was instructed to hear any future cases related to the ACLU's complaint.

=== Subsequent developments ===
Shortly after the Circuit Court ruling, which made much of the NSA's phone metadata surveillance program illegal under the provisions of the Patriot Act, the U.S. Congress clarified the parameters of the program in the USA Freedom Act, which was passed on June 2, 2015. That statute restored some electronic wiretapping techniques and reinstated several types of NSA authority that had expired under the Patriot Act. However, some surveillance powers previously employed by the NSA were restricted.

According to the ACLU, "following the passage of the USA Freedom Act, the government petitioned FISC [Foreign Intelligence Surveillance Court] to allow the NSA to restart the program, arguing that the new law allows it to continue bulk collection during a 180-day transition period." The ACLU argued that the previous ruling did not allow data collection during that transition period, but a motion to this effect was ultimately rejected by the Second Circuit because it complied with the requirements of the new USA Freedom Act.

== Impact ==
The initial ruling in American Civil Liberties Union v. Clapper, in which the Southern District of New York ruled that the NSA phone metadata surveillance program was legal while employing no Constitutional arguments, directly conflicted with a different District Court ruling in Klayman v. Obama in which the Fourth Amendment was discussed prominently. This resulted in a split precedent, which in turn caused significant confusion over whether NSA surveillance violated the Constitution, along with calls for a definitive Supreme Court decision on the matter.

While the later Circuit Court ruling in the Clapper case partially ameliorated the split precedent, it did so on procedural grounds related to provisions in the newly-passed USA Freedom Act, while again avoiding discussions of the conflict between that statute (plus its predecessor the Patriot Act) and the Fourth Amendment. As a result, several commentators noted that courts had thus far largely avoided difficult decisions on whether modern telecommunications surveillance comports with Fourth Amendment requirements for search and seizure and related warrant procedures, or whether older precedents like Smith v. Maryland were still relevant in light of new technologies.

== See also ==
- Litigation over global surveillance
- Mass surveillance in the United States
- Klayman v. Obama
