= 611 Folsom Street =

611 Folsom Street may refer to anything of or relating to the NSA warrantless surveillance controversy and may also refer directly to:

- AT&T's regional switching center, San Francisco.
- Room 641A, located on the sixth floor at AT&T's switching center.
- NSA warrantless surveillance controversy.
- Wiretapping
- Mark Klein, a whistle-blower uncovering U.S. federal spying program.
- San Luis Obispo, data center which routed data to Folsom address.
