= William H. Pauley III =

American federal judge (1952–2021)

Senior Judge of the United States District Court for the Southern District of New York
- In office March 1, 2018 – July 6, 2021

Judge of the United States District Court for the Southern District of New York
- In office October 22, 1998 – March 1, 2018
- Appointed by: Bill Clinton
- Preceded by: Peter K. Leisure
- Succeeded by: John P. Cronan

Personal details
- Born: August 14, 1952 Glen Cove, New York, U.S.
- Died: July 6, 2021 (aged 68) East Quogue, New York, U.S.
- Education: Duke University (BA, JD)

William Henry Pauley III (August 14, 1952 – July 6, 2021) was a United States district judge of the United States District Court for the Southern District of New York. He was noted for issuing the opinion in ACLU v. Clapper in 2013 concerning the legality of the National Security Agency's bulk collection of metadata, as well as sentencing Michael Cohen to three years in prison in 2018.

== Education and career ==
Pauley was born in Glen Cove, New York, on August 14, 1952. He obtained a Bachelor of Arts degree from Duke University in 1974 and a Juris Doctor from Duke University School of Law in 1977. He was a law clerk for the Office of the Nassau County Attorney in New York from 1977 to 1978. He was a Deputy County Attorney in the Nassau County Attorney's Office in 1978. He was in private practice in New York City from 1978 to 1998. He was an assistant counsel for the New York State Assembly Minority Leader from 1984 to 1998.

== Federal judicial service ==
Pauley was nominated by Bill Clinton to a seat on the United States District Court for the Southern District of New York on May 21, 1998. This was to fill the vacancy by Peter K. Leisure. Pauley was confirmed by the United States Senate on October 21, 1998, and received his commission the next day. He assumed senior status on March 1, 2018.

== Notable decisions ==
Pauley oversaw the criminal proceedings against Ben-ami Kadish, who in 2009 pleaded guilty to conspiracy to act as an unregistered agent of Israel and admitted to leaked classified U.S. military documents to an Israeli agent in 1985. In 2009, Pauley sentenced Kadish to a $50,000 fine, declining to impose a prison sentence in light of the defendant's age and health (Kadish was 85 years old at the time). Pauley stated: "This offense is a grave one that implicates the national security of the United States. Why it took the government 23 years to charge Mr. Kadish is shrouded in mystery."

In December 2013, Pauley dismissed a lawsuit brought by the American Civil Liberties Union against the National Security Agency, ACLU v. Clapper, over the NSA's bulk collection of metadata on nearly every phone call made in the United States being legal under Section 215 of the Patriot Act. Pauley's ruling contrasted with the opposite ruling by Judge Richard J. Leon in a similar case in the District of Columbia, Klayman v. Obama. The Second Circuit Court of Appeals reversed Pauley's ruling in May 2015 and remanded the case for further consideration.

Pauley presided over the hearing in August 2018, which saw Michael Cohen, the former personal lawyer of Donald Trump, plead guilty to five counts of tax evasion, one count of providing false information to a credit institution, and two counts of campaign finance law violations. Cohen implicated Donald Trump in the hush money scandal, which involved payments to Karen McDougal and Stormy Daniels in exchange for the women's silence about alleged affairs with Trump (see Stormy Daniels–Donald Trump scandal). In December 2018, Pauley sentenced Cohen to three years in prison.

In November 2018, Pauley declined to approve a proposed settlement in a case brought by the U.S. Attorney's Office against the New York City Housing Authority (NYCHA), the city's long-troubled public housing authority. Pauley ruled that the proposed settlement was "not fair, reasonable or consistent with the public interest" because it had insufficient enforcement mechanisms to address poor conditions in public housing. Pauley criticized the city's mismanagement of NYCHA, and suggested that the federal United States Department of Housing and Urban Development had also failed to perform its legal responsibility.

== Personal life ==
Pauley was married to his wife Kimberly Garneau until his death. Together, they had three sons.

Pauley died on the morning of July 6, 2021, at his home in East Quogue, New York, from bile duct cancer.

Legal offices
Preceded by Peter K. Leisure	Judge of the United States District Court for the Southern District of New York; 1998–2018	Succeeded by John P. Cronan
