= Klayman v. Obama =

American federal court case

- Court: United States District Court for the District of Columbia
- Decided: December 16, 2013
- Defendants: Klayman I: Verizon Communications, President Barack Obama, NSA director (General Keith B. Alexander), Attorney General Eric Holder, Jr., US District Judge Roger Vinson; Klayman II: Facebook, Yahoo!, Google, Microsoft, YouTube, AOL, PalTalk, Skype, Sprint, AT&T, Apple and the same government defendants as in Klayman I

Holding
- Warrantless telecommunications surveillance is not permitted under the Fourth Amendment.

Court membership
- Judge sitting: Richard J. Leon

Klayman v. Obama, 957 F.Supp.2d 1 (D.D.C., 2013), was a decision by the United States District Court for District of Columbia finding that the National Security Agency's (NSA) bulk phone metadata collection program was unconstitutional under the Fourth Amendment. The ruling was later overturned on jurisdictional grounds, leaving the constitutional implications of NSA surveillance unaddressed.

== Background ==
The lawsuit arose in the wake of the Snowden disclosures. The Guardian reported that the Foreign Intelligence Surveillance Court, at the request of the NSA, had ordered Verizon to hand over several months' worth of personal communications records for many of its customers. The phone numbers of both parties on a call were handed over, as was the call's location, time, and duration.

Shortly after the disclosures, conservative activist Larry Klayman, along with several co-plaintiffs, filed suit and named the Obama Administration as the defendant. In a complaint known as Klayman I, Klayman sued on behalf of Verizon Wireless customers against the NSA, the Department of Justice, Verizon Communications, President Barack Obama, Attorney General Eric Holder, and NSA Director General Keith B. Alexander. This complaint alleged that the NSA communications surveillance constituted a search of each customer's personal data, and thus required a warrant under the Fourth Amendment.

In the Klayman II complaint, Klayman sued the same government defendants as well as Facebook, Yahoo!, Google, Microsoft, YouTube, AOL, PalTalk, Skype, Sprint, AT&T, and Apple under the allegation that those companies collaborated with the NSA to hand over data during the surveillance program. In addition to the constitutional argument, this complaint added an allegation of a violation of Section 2702 of the Stored Communications Act. Klayman and his co-plaintiffs also alleged that the government was behind inexplicable phone calls and text messages sent to and from their phone numbers.

== District court ruling ==
The case was heard at the United States District Court for District of Columbia, combining the Klayman I and Klayman II complaints. On December 16, 2013, Judge Richard J. Leon ruled that bulk collection of American telephone metadata likely violates the Fourth Amendment. Leon wrote:

I cannot imagine a more "indiscriminate" and "arbitrary" invasion than this systematic and high-tech collection and retention of personal data on virtually every single citizen for purposes of querying and analyzing it without prior judicial approval [...] Surely, such a program infringes on "that degree of privacy" that the founders enshrined in the Fourth Amendment.

Leon, the first judge to examine an NSA program outside of the secretive Foreign Intelligence Surveillance Court (FISC) on behalf of a non-criminal suspect, described the technology used as "almost Orwellian", referring to the George Orwell novel Nineteen Eighty-Four. Leon stated that he had "serious doubts about the efficacy" of the program, because the government was unable to cite "a single instance in which analysis of the NSA's bulk metadata collection actually stopped an imminent attack, or otherwise aided the government in achieving any objective that was time-sensitive."

Leon ruled that a 1979 Supreme Court precedent that the NSA often cited as justification for its surveillance, Smith v. Maryland (which established that phone metadata is not subject to the Fourth Amendment), did not apply to the NSA program. He termed the use of telephone metadata in Smith v. Maryland as "short-term forward looking capture" and that of NSA as "long-term historical retrospective analysis." Citing the NSA's vast scope and "the evolving role of phones and technology," Leon's opinion pointed out that the Fourth Amendment needs to adapt to the digital age.

In his analysis, Leon rejected the government's argument that the plaintiffs did not have standing to challenge the bulk telephony metadata program. Instead, their fear of being surveilled was not merely speculative. Therefore, the plaintiffs had a substantial likelihood of success on their Fourth Amendment arguments. This was supported by a leaked FISC document stating that Verizon had been ordered to provide customer communication data and business records on a regular basis. Thus, the NSA surveillance constituted a search of each person's data. which in turn required a warrant per the Fourth Amendment.

Although Leon did not find any evidence that plaintiffs' data in particular was being analyzed, he declared that he had reason to believe that everyone's metadata was being analyzed due to the NSA's own descriptions of its programs. In Leon's words, "Because the Government can use daily metadata collection to engage in repetitive, surreptitious surveillance of a citizen's private goings on, the NSA database implicates the Fourth Amendment each time a government official monitors it." Thus, the NSA surveillance program was declared unconstitutional.

Leon dismissed some portions of Klayman's complaints due to lack of evidence or standing, including allegations of the surveillance of foreign nationals via the PRISM program, while the particular NSA program at issue had been discontinued in 2011 so its legality did not need to be addressed. While his ruling deemed NSA telecommunications surveillance to be substantially illegal, Leon stayed the ruling and gave the government six months to appeal.

== Subsequent developments ==
On the ruling, The Washington Post noted: "NSA officials... now stand accused of presiding over a program whose capabilities were deemed by the judge to be 'Orwellian' and likely illegal." Edward Snowden issued a statement in response to the ruling, saying in part:

I acted on my belief that the NSA's mass surveillance programs would not withstand a constitutional challenge, and that the American public deserved a chance to see these issues determined by open courts. Today, a secret program authorized by a secret court was, when exposed to the light of day, found to violate Americans' rights. It is the first of many.

The government exercised Leon's invitation to appeal. On November 20, 2015, the D.C. Circuit Court of Appeals issued a short memorandum opinion that vacated Leon's ruling and held that the plaintiffs failed to meet the heightened burden of proof regarding the standing required for an injunction against a government program. This resulted in the case being remanded back to the District Court for further proceedings in which the matter of the plaintiffs' standing would be discussed further. In 2017, Leon dismissed the suit because Klayman and his co-plaintiffs had failed to demonstrate the actual harm necessary to achieve standing.

== Impact ==
The ruling in Klayman v. Obama directly conflicted with a different District Court ruling in American Civil Liberties Union v. Clapper, in which the Fourth Amendment was not discussed in favor of an analysis of the effectiveness of the NSA's efforts to fight terrorism. This resulted in a split precedent, which in turn caused significant confusion over whether NSA surveillance violates the Constitution, along with calls for a definitive Supreme Court decision on the matter.

While acknowledging Leon's attempts to address the Fourth Amendment implications of NSA data surveillance, legal commentators largely concluded that the ruling left the constitutional questions vague and poorly addressed. Others noted the continuing conflict between the Fourth Amendment and surveillance procedures enabled by the Patriot Act and Foreign Intelligence Surveillance Act, which also remained unclear after the ruling.

== See also ==
- Litigation over global surveillance
- Mass surveillance in the United States
- American Civil Liberties Union v. Clapper
