= United States v. Moalin =

2020 court case on NSA telephone surveillance

- Court: United States Court of Appeals for the Ninth Circuit
- Decided: September 2, 2020

Court membership
- Judges sitting: Marsha Berzon, Jacqueline Nguyen, Jack Zouhary

United States v. Moalin is a court case that was heard and decided by the United States Court of Appeals for the Ninth Circuit. It was an appeal by four Somali individuals who had been convicted based on data obtained through bulk telephone data collection by the National Security Agency. The appeals court upheld their convictions, but also ruled that bulk telephone data collection by the National Security Agency, the details of which were leaked by Edward Snowden, was illegal.

The case proceeded slowly because of classified data, taking seven years. On September 2, 2020, a unanimous decision by the three-judge panel was published. They ruled that bulk collection of telephone data was illegal because it violated the Foreign Intelligence Surveillance Act. They also ruled that it was possibly unconstitutional under the 4th Amendment.

This decision may not have had a major effect, because the bulk telephone data collection program involved in the case ended in 2015, and the program that replaced it was also shut down.

== See also ==
- Litigation over global surveillance
- Mass surveillance in the United States
