= List of Americans under surveillance =

This is a list of some of the prominent U.S. citizens who are known to have been put under surveillance by the federal government of the United States.

== Activists ==
- Helen Keller
- Alice Lee Jemison
- Martin Luther King Jr.

== Businesspersons ==
- Bernard Baruch
- Howard Hughes

== Journalists ==
- Margaret Bourke-White, photojournalist for Life magazine
- Art Buchwald, a columnist for The Washington Post
- David Halberstam, a Pulitzer Prize-winning journalist, author, and historian
- Ernest Hemingway, winner of the 1954 Nobel Prize in Literature
- Norman Mailer, novelist, columnist and The Village Voice co-founder
- Tom Wicker, a columnist for The New York Times

== Politicians ==
=== Congress ===
- Sen. Barry Goldwater
- Sen. Frank Church
- Sen. Howard Baker
- Sen. Strom Thurmond

=== Supreme Court ===
- Associate Justice William O. Douglas

=== White House ===
- First Lady Eleanor Roosevelt

== Science and philosophy ==
- Albert Einstein
- Howard Zinn
- Noam Chomsky
- Edward Said

== Sports and entertainment ==
=== Actors and actresses ===
- Jean Seberg
- Marilyn Monroe
- Marlene Dietrich

=== Athletes ===
- Muhammad Ali

=== Composers ===
- Aaron Copland

=== Jazz musicians ===
- Duke Ellington
- Frank Sinatra
- Louis Armstrong
- Nat King Cole

== Other ==
- Robert Hanssen

== See also ==
- Mass surveillance in the United States
