= Wrenn v. Boy Scouts of America =

U.S. District Court case

- Court: United States District Court for the Northern District of California
- Full case name: Gregory J. Wrenn v. Boy Scouts of America
- Decided: October 28, 2008
- Docket nos.: 3:03-cv-04057

Court membership
- Judge sitting: Jeffrey White

Wrenn v. Boy Scouts of America, No. 3:03-cv-04057, was a case before the United States District Court for the Northern District of California; Wrenn asked for the cancellation of federal trademark registrations of the Boy Scouts of America.

== Background ==
Cub Scouting is a program of the Boy Scouts of America for boys under the age of 11. The daughter of Gregory J. Wrenn was denied admission to the Cub Scout pack where her twin brother was registered. Wrenn founded the National Council of Youthscouts in 2002 as a "non-discriminatory Scouting organization" and in July 2003 filed for the trademark of "Youthscouts" with the United States Patent and Trademark Office.

In July 2003, the BSA filed a notice of opposition with the Trademark Trial and Appeal Board (TTAB) against Wrenn, claiming that the registration and continued use of the term "Youthscouts" would "cause confusion, deception, mistake, and misrepresentation" regarding the name's source or sponsorship, and would cause injury and damage to the BSA.

Their grounds for opposition included an allegation that the word "Scout" is recognized by Americans as being connected with the BSA and points out that some dictionaries' definition of "Scout" includes "a member of the Boy Scouts." The BSA also noted that in addition to standard trademark protection, marks were protected by the congressional charter granted in 1916 under 36 U.S.C. Chapter 309.

In November 2005, Wrenn filed two notices of opposition with the TTAB claiming that the BSA's uses of "Scout Gear" and "Scout Zone" were invalid and alleging that the BSA had "committed fraud on the Trade Mark office and trademark misuse." In February 2006, TTAB consolidated the three cases.

== The case ==
Wrenn filed a lawsuit in September 2003 with the U.S. District Court asking for the cancellation of BSA's federal trademark registrations, claiming among other things that, "The BSA is guilty of unclean hands resulting from the BSA's violation of the antitrust laws of the United States, including, without limitation, obtaining registrations involving generic or descriptive terms through fraud, and using such registrations to prevent competitors from using the terms, in an illegal effort by [the BSA] to monopolize and maintain a monopoly in the market for scouting programs for boys."

The Court had been waiting for a judgment by the TTAB but due to the delay it decided to lift its stay and proceed in August 2007. The TTAB subsequently suspended its proceedings pending final disposition of the civil action.

The court noted the rights afforded the BSA by the 1916 congressional charter and the pre-existing rights in the words "Scout" and "Scouting," citing Girl Scouts of the United States of America v. Hollingsworth, 188 F. Supp. 707, 715 (1960) (a previous trademark case that noted the similar charter afforded the Girl Scouts of the USA) and Adolph Kastor & Bros v. Federal Trade Commission, 138 F.d 824 (2nd Cir, 1943) ("In the foregoing we have not relied upon section 7 of the Act of Congress of June 15, 1916, 36 U.S.C.A. § 27.") On October 11, 2008, the Court issued a preliminary judgment in favor of the BSA, and on October 28, 2008 issued final judgment for the BSA.

Wrenn abandoned opposition to the BSA trademarks on November 26, 2008 and TTAB terminated the case with prejudice.
