= Room 641A =

Telecommunication interception facility

Coordinates: 37°47′07″N 122°23′48″W

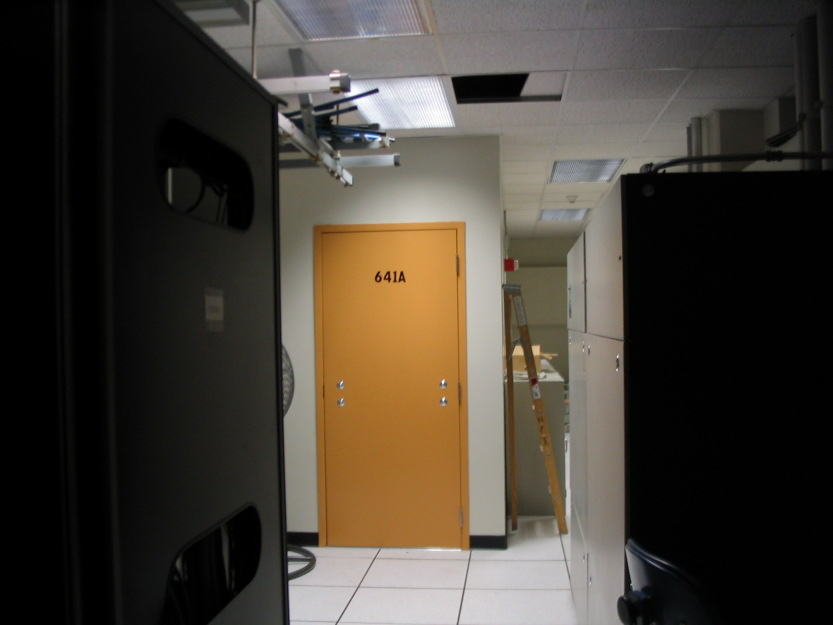
Room 641A's exterior

Room 641A is a telecommunication interception facility operated by AT&T for the U.S. National Security Agency, as part of an American mass surveillance program. The facility commenced operations in 2003, and its purpose was publicly revealed by AT&T technician Mark Klein in 2006.

== Description ==
Room 641A is located in the SBC Communications building at 611 Folsom Street, San Francisco, three floors of which were occupied by AT&T before SBC purchased AT&T. The room was referred to in internal AT&T documents as the SG3 [Study Group 3] Secure Room.

The room measures about 24 by 48 feet (7.3 by 14.6 m) and contains several racks of equipment, including a Narus STA 6400, a device designed to intercept and analyze Internet communications at very high speeds. It is fed by fiber optic lines from beam splitters installed in fiber optic trunks carrying Internet backbone traffic. In the analysis of J. Scott Marcus, a former CTO for GTE and a former adviser to the Federal Communications Commission, it has access to all Internet traffic that passes through the building, and therefore "the capability to enable surveillance and analysis of internet content on a massive scale, including both overseas and purely domestic traffic."

The existence of the room was revealed by former AT&T technician Mark Klein and was the subject of a 2006 class action lawsuit by the Electronic Frontier Foundation against AT&T. Klein claims he was told that similar black rooms are operated at other facilities around the country.

Room 641A and the controversies surrounding it were subjects of an episode of Frontline, the current affairs documentary program on PBS. It was originally broadcast on May 15, 2007. It was also featured on PBS's NOW on March 14, 2008. The room was also covered in the PBS Nova episode "The Spy Factory".

== Lawsuits ==
The Electronic Frontier Foundation (EFF) filed a class-action lawsuit, Hepting v. AT&T, against the company on January 31, 2006, accusing the telecommunication company of violating the law and the privacy of its customers by collaborating with the National Security Agency (NSA) in a massive, illegal program to wiretap and data-mine Americans' communications. On July 20, 2006, a federal judge denied the government's and AT&T's motions to dismiss the case, chiefly on the ground of the state secrets privilege, allowing the lawsuit to go forward. On August 15, 2007, the case was heard by the Ninth Circuit Court of Appeals and was dismissed on December 29, 2011, based on a retroactive grant of immunity by Congress for telecommunications companies that cooperated with the government. The U.S. Supreme Court declined to hear the case.

A separate case filed by the Electronic Frontier Foundation was titled Jewel v. NSA and was filed on September 18, 2008. After many years of litigation, on April 25, 2019, the ruling from the Northern District of California concluded that the evidence presented by the plaintiff's experts was insufficient: "the Court confirms its earlier finding that Klein cannot establish the content, function, or purpose of the secure room at the AT&T site based on his own independent knowledge." The ruling noted that "Klein can only speculate about what data were actually processed and by whom in the secure room and how and for what purpose, as he was never involved in its operation." The Court further went on to discredit other experts called upon, citing their heavy reliance on the Klein declaration.

In the spring of 2006, over 50 other lawsuits were filed against various telecommunications companies in response to the article. There has been speculation that several rooms similar to this exist all over the United States.

== Gallery ==
Page 17: Basic diagram of how the alleged wiretapping was accomplished. From EFF court filings.

Page 9: More complicated diagram of how it allegedly worked. From EFF court filings.

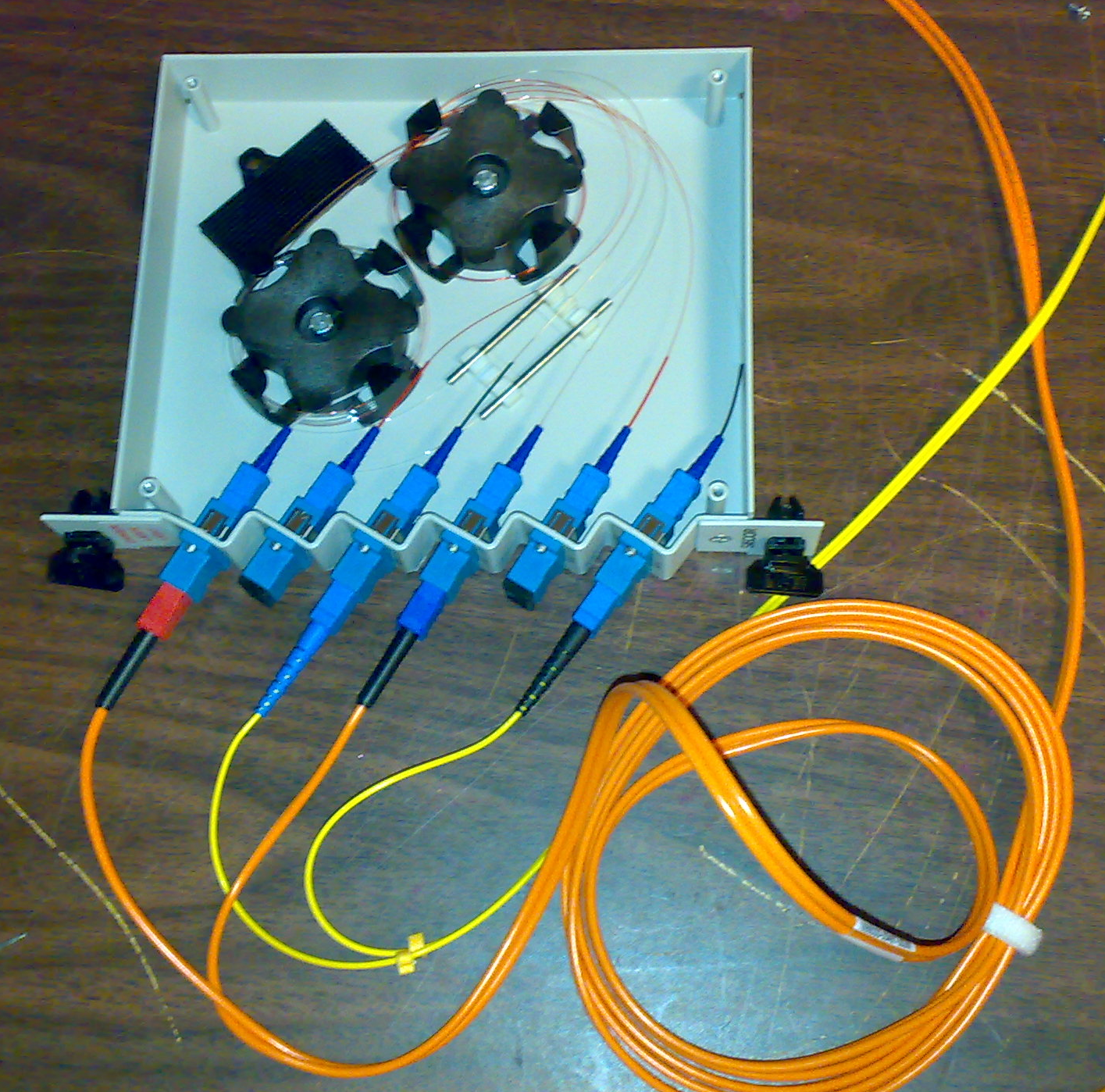
A fiber optic tap

== See also ==
- 33 Thomas Street – Skyscraper in Manhattan, New York, US
- Cabinet noir – Type of government intelligence gathering office
- ECHELON – Signals intelligence collection and analysis network
- Fairview – Domestic spying partnership between AT&T and the NSA
- Fiber tapping – Extraction of a signal from an optical fiber
- Hemisphere Project – Mass surveillance program conducted by AT&T and paid for by the DEA
- Main Core – Alleged American government database
- NSA warrantless surveillance controversy – Part of Terrorist Surveillance Program
- President's Surveillance Program – Intelligence activities in the US
- PRISM – Mass surveillance program run by the NSA
- Signals intelligence – Intelligence-gathering by interception of signals
- Upstream collection – Term used by the National Security Agency
- Utah Data Center – NSA data storage facility
