= Jeffrey White =

American judge (born 1945)

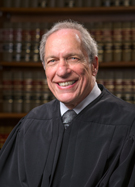

Senior Judge of the United States District Court for the Northern District of California
- Incumbent
- Assumed office February 1, 2021

Judge of the United States District Court for the Northern District of California
- In office November 15, 2002 – February 1, 2021
- Appointed by: George W. Bush
- Preceded by: Charles A. Legge
- Succeeded by: Araceli Martínez-Olguín

Personal details
- Born: Jeffrey Steven White; 1945 (age 80–81) New York City, New York, U.S.
- Education: Queens College, CUNY (BA); University at Buffalo (JD)

Jeffrey Steven White (born 1945) is a senior United States district judge of the United States District Court for the Northern District of California.

== Early life, education, and career ==
Born in New York City, White received a Bachelor of Arts from Queens College, City University of New York in 1967 and a Juris Doctor from the University at Buffalo Law School in 1970. He was an attorney in the Criminal Division of the United States Department of Justice from 1970 to 1971 and again from 1977 to 1978, serving in the interim as an assistant United States attorney for the United States District Court for the District of Maryland. He was in private practice in San Francisco, California from 1978 to 2002.

=== Federal judicial service ===
On July 25, 2002, White was nominated by President George W. Bush to a seat on the United States District Court for the Northern District of California vacated by Judge Charles A. Legge. White was confirmed by the United States Senate on November 14, 2002. He received commission on November 15, 2002. He assumed senior status on February 1, 2021.

=== Global warming ruling ===
- In 2005, White allowed environmental groups and four municipalities to go forward with a lawsuit against federal agencies. The basis for the lawsuit was a claim that the federal government is contributing to global warming by funding various overseas projects.

=== Glyphosate-resistant sugar beet regulation ===
In 2009, White ruled that the federal government agency USDA-APHIS had violated Federal Law in deregulating glyphosate-resistant sugar beet without adequately evaluating the environmental and socio-economic impacts of allowing commercial production. On August 13, 2010, White revoked the deregulation of glyphosate-resistant sugar beet in the Spring of 2011. As a result of this ruling, growers were permitted to harvest and process their crop at the end of the 2010 growing season, yet a ban on new plantings was enacted. After the ruling, glyphosate-resistant sugar beet could not be planted until the USDA-APHIS filed an Environmental Impact Statement (EIR). the purpose of the EIR is to determine if environmental issues have negative impacts on the environment, and it may take two to three years to complete the study. After the EIR statement is completed, USDA-APHIS may petition to deregulate glyphosate-resistant sugar beet.

Immediately after White's ruling, USDA-APHIS prepared an Environmental Assessment seeking partial deregulation of glyphosate-resistant sugar beet. The Assessment was filed based on a request received from Monsanto and KWS SAAT AG, a German seed company. Both companies, as well as the sugar beet industry employees and growers, believed a sugar shortage would occur if glyphosate-resistant sugar beet could not be planted. As a response to this concern, USDA-APHIS developed three options in the Environmental Assessment to address the concerns of environmentalists, as well as those raised by the industry. The first option was to not plant glyphosate-resistant sugar beet until the Environmental Impact Statement was completed. The second option was to allow growers to plant glyphosate-resistant sugar beet if they obtained a USDA-APHIS permit and followed specific mandates. Under the third and final option, glyphosate-resistant sugar beet would be partially deregulated but monitored by Monsanto and KWS SSAT AG. USDA-APHIS preferred the second option. They placed the Environmental Assessment in the Federal Register on November 4, 2010, and received a public comment for thirty days.

On February 4, 2011, the USDA-APHIS announced glyphosate-resistant sugar beet had been partially deregulated and growers would be allowed to plant seed from spring 2011 until an Environmental Impact Statement is completed. USDA-APHIS developed requirements that growers must follow if handling glyphosate-resistant sugar beet and will monitor growers throughout the partial deregulation period. The requirements are classified into categories which include planting glyphosate-resistant sugar beet for seed production, planting for sugar production, and transporting sugar beet across state lines. Failure to follow the requirements set by USDA-APHIS may result in civil or criminal charges and destruction of the crop. In July 2012, after completing an Environmental Impact Assessment and a Plant Pest Risk Assessment the USDA deregulated Monsanto's Roundup Ready sugar beets.

=== Wikileaks ruling ===
In February 2008, White shut down the ISP for the American mirror of the Website WikiLeaks. The basis for this action was a claim by the Swiss banking group Julius Baer. On February 18, 2008, White approved an agreement between Dynadot and Baer (an injunction based on stipulation); this action garnered news coverage around the world.

White’s order was widely criticized as both improper (prior restraint is generally prohibited by the First Amendment) and ineffective (Wikileaks' web servers are in Sweden, and numerous mirrors exist).

White vacated his injunction on February 29, 2008, citing First Amendment concerns and questions about legal jurisdiction. Wikileaks was thus able to bring its site online again. The bank dropped the case on March 5, 2008. The judge also denied the bank's request for an order prohibiting the website's publication.

The Executive Director of the Reporters Committee for Freedom of the Press, Lucy Dalglish, commented:

"It's not very often a federal judge does a 180-degree turn in a case and dissolves an order. But we're very pleased the judge recognized the constitutional implications in this prior restraint."

=== Defense of Marriage Act ===
In 2012, White ruled in favour of a staff attorney in the United States Court of Appeals for the Ninth Circuit who sued to get health benefits for her spouse under California law. In his ruling he struck down the Defense of Marriage Act for failing even the most deferential rational basis test.

=== Israel–Gaza war ===
In 2024, White "implored the Biden administration to 'examine the results of their unflagging support' of Israel" in the Gaza war. He also found that "[t]here is strong evidence that Israel’s 'military siege in Gaza is intended to eradicate a whole people and therefore plausibly falls within the international prohibition against genocide."

== See also ==
- John Yoo § Federal tort suit
- Wolf hunting
- Wrenn v. Boy Scouts of America
- Jacobsen v. Katzer
- Jewel v. National Security Agency

Legal offices
Preceded by Charles A. Legge	Judge of the United States District Court for the Northern District of California; 2002–2021	Succeeded by Araceli Martínez-Olguín
