= Araceli Martínez-Olguín =

American judge (born 1977)

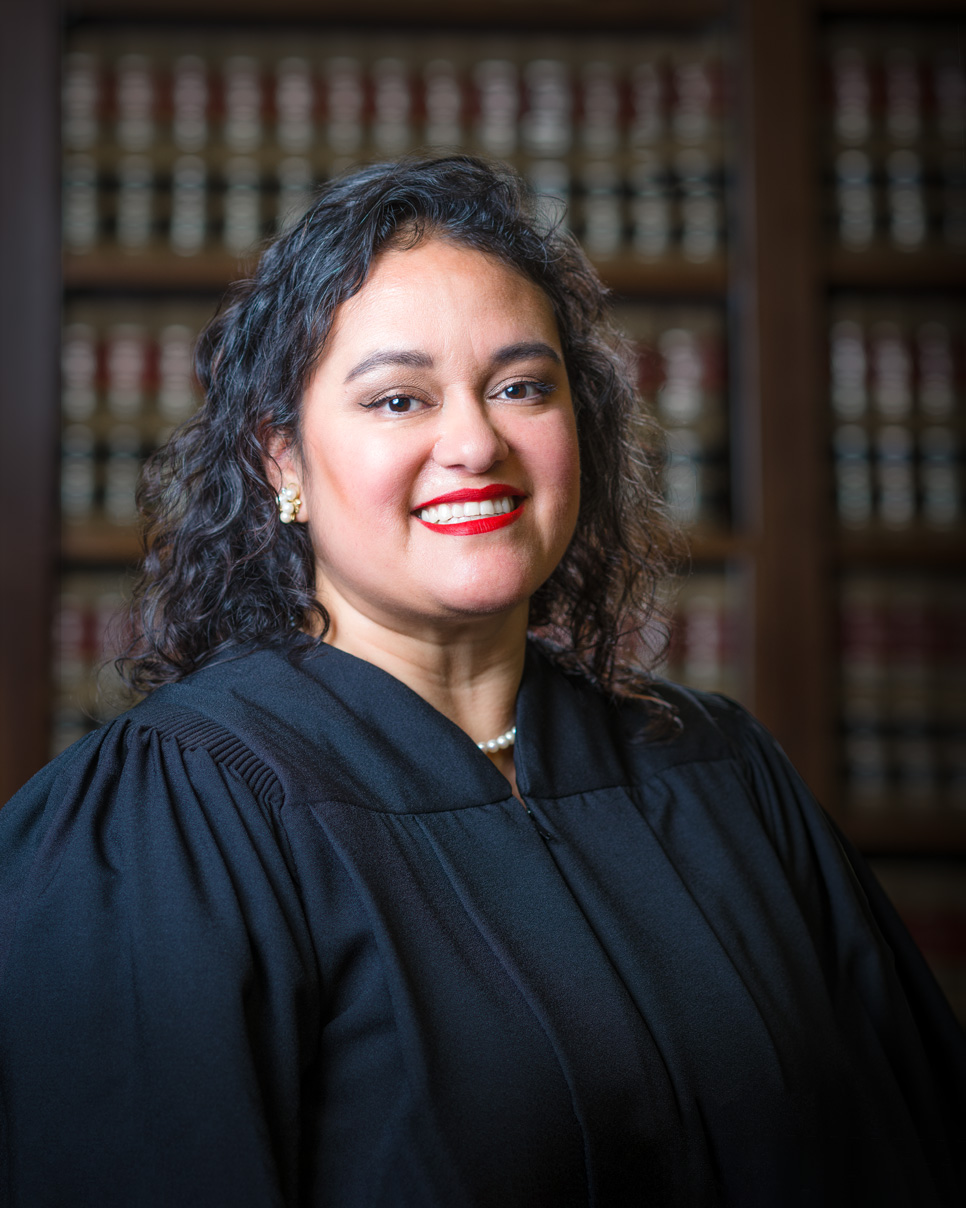
- Martinez-Olguin in 2023

Judge of the United States District Court for the Northern District of California
- Incumbent
- Assumed office March 3, 2023
- Appointed by: Joe Biden
- Preceded by: Jeffrey White

Personal details
- Born: 1977 (age 48–49) Mexico City, Mexico
- Education: Princeton University (BA); University of California, Berkeley (JD)

Araceli Martínez-Olguín (born 1977) is a Mexican-American lawyer from California who serves as a United States district judge of the United States District Court for the Northern District of California.

== Education ==
Martínez-Olguín received a Bachelor of Arts from the Princeton School of Public and International Affairs in 1999 and a Juris Doctor from the UC Berkeley School of Law in 2004.

== Career ==
From 2004 to 2006, Martínez-Olguín served as a law clerk for Judge David Briones of the United States District Court for the Western District of Texas. From 2016 to 2017, she was an attorney for the United States Department of Education's Office for Civil Rights. From 2017 to 2018, she served as the managing attorney at the Immigrants' Rights Project at Community Legal Services in East Palo Alto, California. From 2018 to 2023, she was the supervising attorney at the National Immigration Law Center. She has also worked at the ACLU and at the Legal Aid Society-Employment Law Center. Martínez-Olguín was a member of the American Constitution Society Bay Area Lawyer Chapter's board of directors from 2015 to 2022.

=== Federal judicial service ===
On July 29, 2022, President Joe Biden announced his intent to nominate Martínez-Olguín to serve as a United States district judge of the United States District Court for the Northern District of California. On August 1, 2022, her nomination was sent to the Senate. President Biden nominated Martínez-Olguín to the seat vacated by Judge Jeffrey White, who assumed senior status on February 1, 2021. On September 21, 2022, a hearing on her nomination was held before the Senate Judiciary Committee. On December 1, 2022, her nomination was reported out of committee by a 12–10 vote. On January 3, 2023, her nomination was returned to the President under Rule XXXI, Paragraph 6 of the United States Senate; she was renominated later the same day. On February 2, 2023, her nomination was reported out of committee by an 11–9 vote. On February 28, 2023, the Senate invoked cloture on her nomination by a 48–47 vote. Later that day, her nomination was confirmed by a 49–48 vote, with the Vice President Kamala Harris voting in the affirmative. She received her judicial commission on March 3, 2023. She is the second Latina to serve on the U.S. District Court for the Northern District of California.

== See also ==
- List of Hispanic and Latino American jurists
- Joe Biden judicial appointment controversies

Legal offices
Preceded by Jeffrey White	Judge of the United States District Court for the Northern District of California; 2023–present	Incumbent
