= John P. Cronan =

American judge (born 1976)

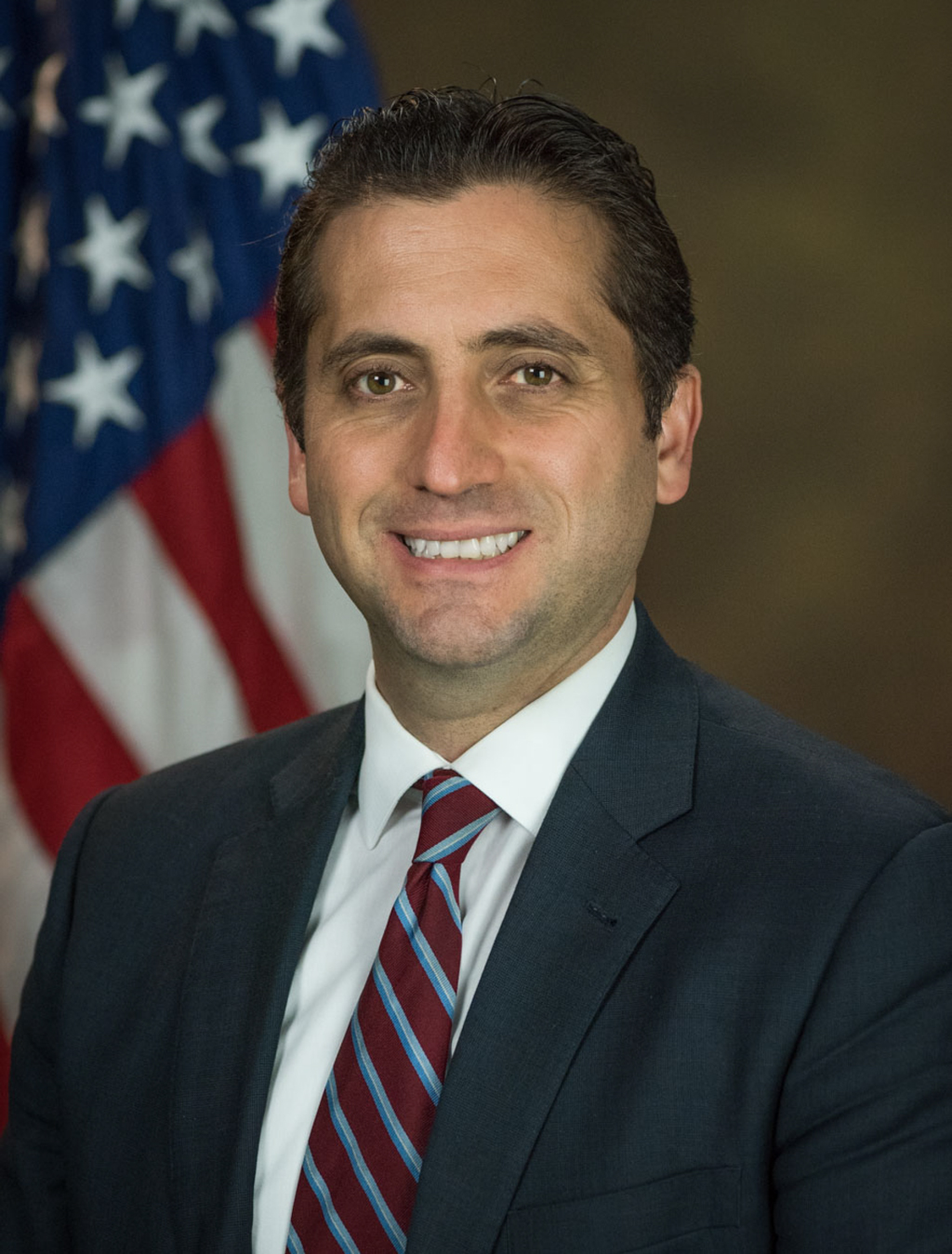

Judge of the United States District Court for the Southern District of New York
- Incumbent
- Assumed office August 10, 2020
- Appointed by: Donald Trump
- Preceded by: William H. Pauley III

United States Assistant Attorney General for the Criminal Division Acting
- In office November 2017 – July 16, 2018
- President: Donald Trump
- Preceded by: Kenneth A. Blanco (Acting)
- Succeeded by: Brian Benczkowski

Personal details
- Born: 1976 (age 49–50) Teaneck, New Jersey, U.S.
- Education: Georgetown University (BA); Yale University (JD)

John Peter Cronan (born 1976) is an American lawyer serving as a United States district judge of the United States District Court for the Southern District of New York. He was formerly acting United States assistant attorney general for the United States Department of Justice Criminal Division.

== Education ==
Cronan graduated from Bergen Catholic High School in Oradell, New Jersey, and earned his Bachelor of Arts in government and economics, magna cum laude, from Georgetown University in 1998, where he was inducted into Phi Beta Kappa. Cronan then earned his Juris Doctor in 2001 from Yale Law School where he was the editor-in-chief of the Yale Law & Policy Review and was awarded the John Fletcher Caskey Prize for best performance in the Thomas Swan Barristers' Union trial competition.

== Career ==
After graduating from law school, Cronan served as a law clerk to Judge Barrington D. Parker Jr. on both the United States District Court for the Southern District of New York and the United States Court of Appeals for the Second Circuit from 2001 to 2002. He later clerked for Judge Robert Katzmann of the United States Court of Appeals for the Second Circuit from 2002 to 2003.

Cronan was an Assistant United States Attorney for the Southern District of New York from 2007 to 2017, where he supervised the Terrorism and International Narcotics Unit from 2014 to 2017 and served in the Office's Civil Division from 2003 to 2007. As an Assistant United States Attorney, Cronan handled the prosecutions of, among others, Sulaiman Abu Ghayth, a close associate of Usama Bin Laden who served as al Qaeda's spokesperson before and after the 9/11 attacks; Mustafa Kamel Mustafa, a/k/a "Abu Hamza al Masri," for terrorist activities in the United States and elsewhere; and Faisal Shahzad, for attempting to detonate a bomb in Times Square on May 1, 2010.

After leaving the U.S. Attorney's office, Cronan served as the acting United States Assistant Attorney General for the United States Department of Justice Criminal Division from November 2017 to July 2018. Immediately before becoming a judge, Cronan was the Principal Deputy Assistant Attorney General for the Criminal Division from 2017 to 2020.

Cronan was previously an adjunct professor at New York University School of Law from 2015 to 2017, where he co-taught a seminar on federal criminal prosecutions. Cronan has taught a course on professional responsibility and the regulation of lawyers at New York University School of Law since 2022.

=== Federal judicial service ===
On November 6, 2019, President Donald Trump announced his intent to nominate Cronan to serve as a United States district judge of the United States District Court for the Southern District of New York. Upon nomination, he received a unanimous "well qualified" rating from the American Bar Association. On December 2, 2019, his nomination was sent to the Senate. President Trump nominated Cronan to the seat vacated by Judge William H. Pauley III, who assumed senior status on March 1, 2018. On January 3, 2020, his nomination was returned to the President under Rule XXXI, Paragraph 6 of the Senate. On February 27, 2020, his renomination was sent to the Senate. On March 4, 2020, a hearing on his nomination was held before the Senate Judiciary Committee. On May 14, 2020, his nomination was reported out of committee by a 12–10 vote. On August 6, 2020, the Senate invoked cloture on his nomination by a 55–42 vote. His nomination was confirmed later that day by a 55–42 vote. He received his judicial commission on August 10, 2020.

== Memberships ==
Cronan has been a member of the Federalist Society since 2017. Since 1998, he has been an inactive member of Phi Beta Kappa.

Legal offices
Preceded by Kenneth A. Blanco; Acting	United States Assistant Attorney General for the Criminal Division; Acting; 2017–2018	Succeeded by Brian Benczkowski
Preceded by William H. Pauley III	Judge of the United States District Court for the Southern District of New York; 2020–present	Incumbent
