= Mass surveillance in the United States =

The practice of mass surveillance in the United States, which entails the pervasive surveillance of virtually all Americans' communications, dates back to wartime monitoring and censorship of international communications from, to, or which passed through the United States.

After the First and Second World Wars, mass surveillance continued throughout the Cold War period, via programs such as the Black Chamber and Project SHAMROCK. President Harry S. Truman established the National Security Agency (NSA) in 1952 for the purposes of collecting, processing, and monitoring intelligence data. The formation of the international UKUSA surveillance agreement of 1946 evolved into the ECHELON collaboration by 1955 of five English-speaking nations, also known as the Five Eyes, and focused on interception of electronic communications, with substantial increases in domestic surveillance capabilities.

The formation and growth of federal law-enforcement and intelligence agencies such as the FBI, CIA, and NSA institutionalized surveillance used to also silence political dissent, as evidenced by COINTELPRO projects which targeted various organizations and individuals. During the Civil Rights Movement era, many individuals put under surveillance orders were first labelled as integrationists, then deemed subversive, and sometimes suspected to be supportive of the communist model of the United States' rival at the time, the Soviet Union. Other targeted individuals and groups included Native American activists, African American and Chicano liberation movement activists, and anti-war protesters.

When the Citizens' Commission to Investigate the FBI published stolen FBI documents revealing abuse of intelligence programs in 1971, Senator Frank Church began an investigation into the programs that become known as the Church Committee. The committee sought to investigate intelligence abuses throughout the 1970s. Following a report provided by the committee outlining egregious abuse, in 1976 Congress established the Senate Select Committee on Intelligence. It would later be joined by the Foreign Intelligence Surveillance Court in 1978. The institutions worked to limit the power of the agencies, ensuring that surveillance activities remained within the rule of law.

Following the attacks of September 11, 2001, domestic and international mass surveillance capabilities grew immensely. Congress passed the Patriot Act to strengthen security and intelligence efforts. The act granted the President broad powers on the war against terror, including the power to bypass the FISA Court for surveillance orders in cases of national security. Additionally, mass surveillance activities were conducted alongside various other surveillance programs under the head of President's Surveillance Program. Contemporary mass surveillance relies upon annual presidential executive orders declaring a continued State of National Emergency, first signed by George W. Bush on September 14, 2001 and then continued on an annual basis during the presidencies of Barack Obama, Joe Biden, and Donald Trump. The FISA Amendments Act of 2008 authorized the PRISM surveillance program. Political commentators have criticized these acts, orders, and resulting database network of fusion centers as forming an American police state that institutionalized the illegal COINTELPRO tactics used to assassinate dissenters and leaders from the 1950s onwards. Under pressure from the public, the warrantless wiretapping program was allegedly ended in January 2007.

Additional surveillance agencies, such as the DHS and the position of Director of National Intelligence, have greatly escalated mass surveillance since 2001. A series of media reports in 2013 revealed more recent programs and techniques employed by the US intelligence community. Many details about the surveillance activities conducted in the United States were revealed in the disclosure by Edward Snowden in June 2013. Regarded as one of the biggest media leaks in the United States, it presented extensive details about the surveillance programs of the NSA, that involved interception of Internet data and telephonic calls from over a billion users, across various countries. Advances in computer and information technology allow the creation of huge national databases that facilitate mass surveillance in the United States by DHS managed fusion centers, the CIA's Terrorist Threat Integration Center (TTIC) program, and the FBI's Terrorist Screening Database (TSDB).

== History ==
=== Post World War I ===
After World War I, the US Army and State Department established the Black Chamber, also known as the Cipher Bureau, which began operations in 1919. The Black Chamber was headed by Herbert O. Yardley, who had been a leader in the Army's Military Intelligence program. Regarded as a precursor to the National Security Agency, it conducted peacetime decryption of material including diplomatic communications until 1929.

In the advent of World War II, the Office of Censorship was established. The wartime agency monitored "communications by mail, cable, radio, or other means of transmission passing between the United States and any foreign country". This included the 350,000 overseas cables and telegrams and 25,000 international telephone calls made each week. "Every letter that crossed international or U.S. territorial borders from December 1941 to August 1945 was subject to being opened and scoured for details."

=== Post World War II ===
With the end of World War II, Project SHAMROCK was established in 1945. The organization was created to accumulate telegraphic data entering and exiting from the United States. Major communication companies such as Western Union, RCA Global and ITT World Communications actively aided the project, allowing American intelligence officials to gain access to international message traffic. Under the project, and many subsequent programs, no precedent had been established for judicial authorization, and no warrants were issued for surveillance activities. The project was terminated in 1975.

=== Establishment of the FBI ===
Institutional domestic surveillance was founded in 1896 with the National Bureau of Criminal Identification, which evolved by 1908 into the Bureau of Investigation, operated under the authority of the Department of Justice. In 1935, the Federal Bureau of Investigation had grown into an independent agency under the direction of J. Edgar Hoover whose staff, through the use of wire taps, cable taps, mail tampering, garbage filtering and infiltrators, prepared secret FBI Index Lists on more than 10 million people by 1939.

=== Establishment of the NSA ===
In 1947, the National Security Act was signed by President Truman, establishing a National Security Council. In 1949, the Armed Forces Security Agency was established to coordinate signal operations between military branches. In 1952, the National Security Agency (NSA) was officially established by President Truman by way of a National Security Council Intelligence Directive 9, dated Oct. 24, while the NSA officially came into existence days later on Nov. 4. The existence of NSA was not known to people as the memorandum by President Truman was classified. According to The New York Times, the NSA was created in "absolute secrecy" by President Truman, whose surveillance-minded administration ordered, only six weeks after President Truman took office, wiretaps on the telephones of Thomas Gardiner Corcoran, a close advisor of Franklin D. Roosevelt. The recorded conversations are kept at the Harry S. Truman Presidential Library and Museum, along with other documents considered sensitive.

=== McCarthyism and COINTELPRO ===
Purported to be chasing 'communists' and other alleged subversives, the FBI used public and private pressure to destroy the lives of those it targeted during McCarthyism, including those lives of the Hollywood 10 with the Hollywood blacklist. The FBI's surveillance and investigation roles expanded in the 1950s while using the collected information to facilitate political assassinations, including the murders of Fred Hampton and Mark Clark in 1969. FBI is also directly connected to the bombings, assassinations, and deaths of other people including Malcolm X in 1963, Viola Liuzzo in 1965, Dr. Martin Luther King Jr. in 1968, Anna Mae Pictou Aquash in 1976, and Judi Bari in 1990.

As the extent of the FBI's domestic surveillance continued to grow, many celebrities were also secretly investigated by the bureau, including:

- First Lady Eleanor Roosevelt – A vocal critic of Hoover who likened the FBI to an 'American Gestapo' for its Index lists. Roosevelt also spoke out against anti-Japanese prejudice during the second world war, and was later a delegate to the United Nations and instrumental in creating the Universal Declaration of Human Rights. The 3,000-page FBI dossier on Eleanor Roosevelt reveals Hoover's close monitoring of her activities and writings, and contains retaliatory charges against her for suspected Communist activities.
- Frank Sinatra – His 1,300 page FBI dossier, dating from 1943, contains allegations about Sinatra's possible ties to the American Communist Party. The FBI spent several decades tracking Sinatra and his associates.
- Marilyn Monroe – Her FBI dossier begins in 1955 and continues up until the months before her death. It focuses mostly on her travels and associations, searching for signs of leftist views and possible ties to communism. Monroe's FBI dossier is "heavily censored", but a "reprocessed" version has been released by the FBI to the public.
- John Lennon – In 1971, shortly after Lennon arrived in the United States on a visa to meet up with anti-war activists, the FBI placed Lennon under surveillance, and the U.S. government tried to deport him from the country. At that time, opposition to the Vietnam War had reached a peak and Lennon often showed up at political rallies to sing his anti-war anthem "Give Peace a Chance". The U.S. government argued that Lennon's 300 page FBI dossier was particularly sensitive because its release may "lead to foreign diplomatic, economic and military retaliation against the United States", and therefore only approved a "heavily censored" version.
- Albert Einstein, who supported the anti-war movement and opposed nuclear proliferation, was a member of numerous civil rights groups including the National Association for the Advancement of Colored People (See Albert Einstein's political views). As a result of his political views, Einstein was subjected to telephone tapping, and his mail was searched by the U.S. Federal Bureau of Investigation (FBI) as part of a secret government campaign that aimed to link him with a Soviet espionage ring in order to first discredit him, and then deport him (unsuccessfully) from the United States.
- Martin Luther King Jr., a leader of the Civil Rights Movement, was the target of an intensive campaign by the FBI to "neutralize" him as an effective civil rights activist. An FBI memo recognized King to be the "most dangerous and effective Negro leader in the country.", and the agency wanted to discredit him by collecting evidence to (unsuccessfully) prove that he had been influenced by communism.
- Daniel Ellsberg, who leaked the Pentagon Papers to the media in 1971, experienced one of the most spectacular episodes of government surveillance and character assassination. The White House tried to steal his medical records and other possibly detrimental information by sending a special unit to break into the office of Ellsberg's psychiatrist. These activities were later uncovered during the course of investigation as the Watergate scandal slowly unfolded, which eventually led to the resignation of President Richard Nixon.

1967–73: The now-defunct Project MINARET was created to spy on U.S. citizens. At the request of the U.S. Army, those who protested against the Vietnam War were put on the NSA's "watch list".

The Church Committee of the United States Senate published the final report on "Intelligence Activities and the Rights of Americans" in 1976 (PDF, 26.54 MB)

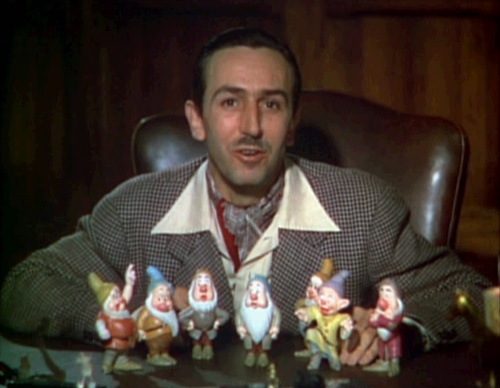
From 1940 until his death in 1966, the American business magnate Walt Disney served as a "S.A.C. Contact" (trusted informant) for the U.S. government to weed out communists and dissidents from the entertainment industry, according to documents obtained by The New York Times. See also: Hollywood blacklist

=== Church committee review ===
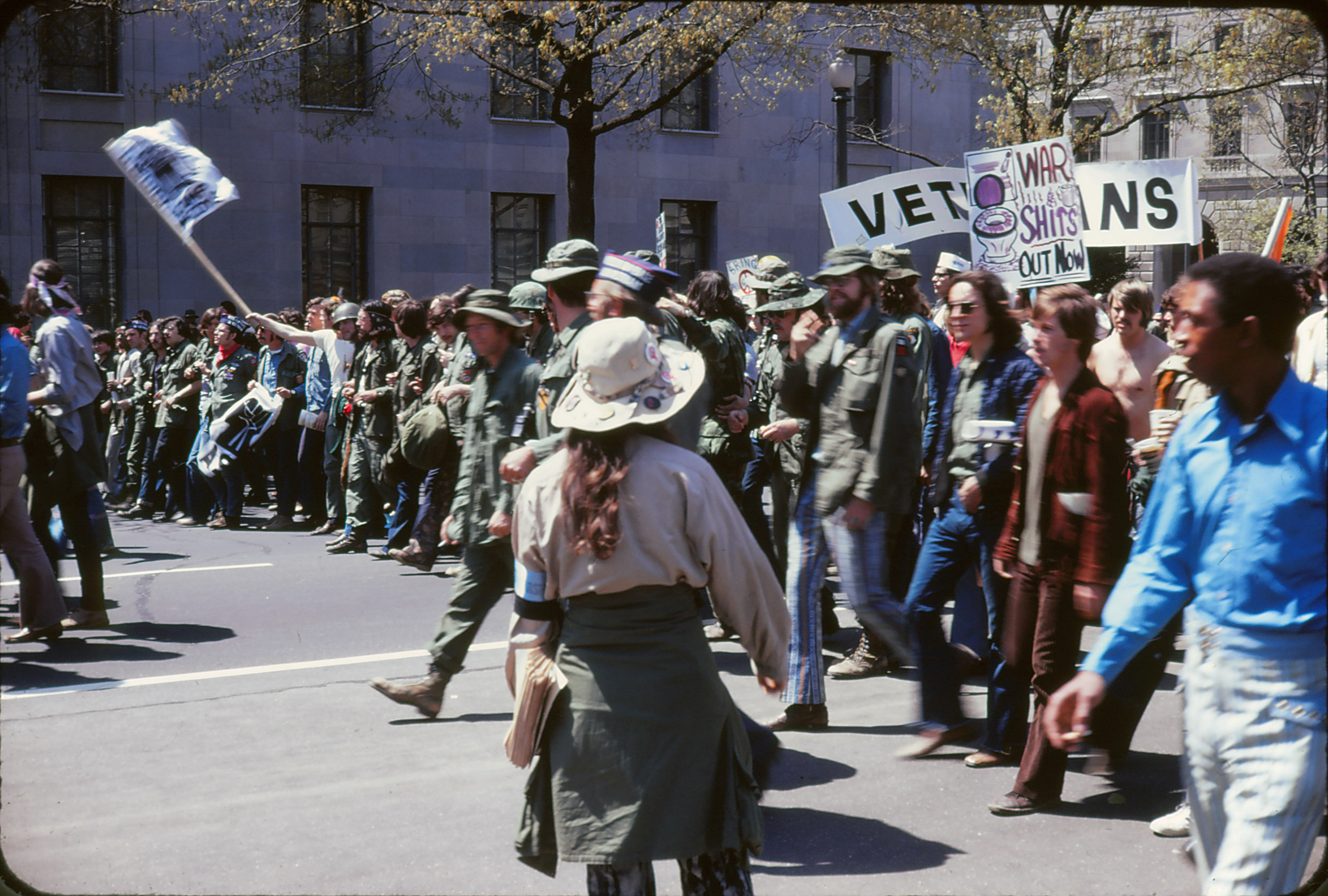
At the request of the U.S. Army, those who protested against the Vietnam War were put on the NSA's "watch list".

In 1975, the Church Committee of the United States Senate was set up to investigate widespread intelligence abuses by the NSA, CIA and FBI. Domestic surveillance, authorized by the highest executive branch of the federal government, spanned from the FDR Administration to the Presidency of Richard Nixon. The following examples were reported by the Church Committee:

- President Roosevelt asked the FBI to put in its files the names of citizens sending telegrams to the White House opposing his "national defense" policy and supporting Col. Charles Lindbergh.
- President Truman received inside information on a former Roosevelt aide's efforts to influence his appointments, labor union negotiating plans, and the publishing plans of journalists.
- President Eisenhower received reports on purely political and social contacts with foreign officials by Bernard Baruch, Eleanor Roosevelt, and Supreme Court Justice William O. Douglas.
- The Kennedy administration ordered the FBI to wiretap a congressional staff member, three executive officials, a lobbyist, and a Washington law firm. US Attorney General Robert F. Kennedy received data from an FBI wire tap on Martin Luther King Jr. and an electronic listening device targeting a congressman, both of which yielded information of a political nature.
- President Johnson asked the FBI to conduct "name checks" on his critics and members of the staff of his 1964 opponent, Senator Barry Goldwater. He also requested purely political intelligence on his critics in the Senate, and received extensive intelligence reports on political activity at the 1964 Democratic Convention from FBI electronic surveillance.
- President Nixon authorized a program of wiretaps which produced for the White House purely political or personal information unrelated to national security, including information about a Supreme Court justice.

The Final Report (Book II) of the Church Committee revealed the following statistics:

- Over 26,000 individuals were at one point catalogued on an FBI list of persons to be rounded up in the event of a "national emergency".
- Over 500,000 domestic intelligence files were kept at the FBI headquarters, of which 65,000 were opened in 1972 alone.
- At least 130,000 first class letters were opened and photographed by the FBI from 1940 to 1966.
- A quarter of a million first class letters were opened and photographed by the CIA from 1953 to 1973.
- Millions of private telegrams sent from, or to, through the United States were obtained by the National Security Agency (NSA), under a secret arrangement with U.S. telegraph companies, from 1947 to 1975.
- Over 100,000 Americans have been indexed in U.S. Army intelligence files.
- About 300,000 individuals were indexed in a CIA computer system during the course of Operation CHAOS.
- Intelligence files on more than 11,000 individuals and groups were created by the Internal Revenue Service (IRS), with tax investigations "done on the basis of political rather than tax criteria".

In response to the committee's findings, the United States Congress passed the Foreign Intelligence Surveillance Act in 1978, which led to the establishment of the United States Foreign Intelligence Surveillance Court, which was authorized to issue surveillance warrants.

Several decades later in 2013, the presiding judge of the FISA Court, Reggie Walton, told The Washington Post that the court only has a limited ability to supervise the government's surveillance, and is therefore "forced" to rely upon the accuracy of the information that is provided by federal agents.

On August 17, 1975 Senator Frank Church stated on NBC's "Meet the Press" without mentioning the name of the NSA about this agency:

In the need to develop a capacity to know what potential enemies are doing, the United States government has perfected a technological capability that enables us to monitor the messages that go through the air. Now, that is necessary and important to the United States as we look abroad at enemies or potential enemies. We must know, at the same time, that capability at any time could be turned around on the American people, and no American would have any privacy left such is the capability to monitor everything — telephone conversations, telegrams, it doesn't matter. There would be no place to hide.

If this government ever became a tyrant, if a dictator ever took charge in this country, the technological capacity that the intelligence community has given the government could enable it to impose total tyranny, and there would be no way to fight back because the most careful effort to combine in resistance to the government, no matter how privately it was done, is within the reach of the government to know. Such is the capability of this technology.

I don't want to see this country ever go across the bridge. I know the capacity that is there to make tyranny total in America, and we must see to it that this agency and all agencies that possess this technology operate within the law and under proper supervision so that we never cross over that abyss. That is the abyss from which there is no return.

=== ECHELON ===
In 1988 an article titled "Somebody's listening" by Duncan Campbell in the New Statesman described the signals-intelligence gathering activities of a program code-named "ECHELON". The program was engaged by English-speaking World War II Allied countries – Australia, Canada, New Zealand, the United Kingdom and the United States (collectively known as AUSCANNZUKUS). It was created by the five countries to monitor the military and diplomatic communications of the Soviet Union and of its Eastern Bloc allies during the Cold War in the early 1960s.

By the 1990s the ECHELON system could intercept satellite transmissions, public switched telephone network (PSTN) communications (including most Internet traffic), and transmissions carried by microwave. The New Zealand journalist Nicky Hager provided a detailed description of ECHELON in his 1996 book Secret Power. While some member governments denied the existence of ECHELON, a report by a committee of the European Parliament in 2001 confirmed the program's use and warned Europeans about its reach and effects. The European Parliament stated in its report that the term "ECHELON" occurred in a number of contexts, but that the evidence presented indicated it was a signals-intelligence collection system capable of interception and content-inspection of telephone calls, fax, e-mail and other data-traffic globally.

James Bamford further described the capabilities of ECHELON in Body of Secrets (2002) about the National Security Agency. Intelligence monitoring of citizens, and their communications, in the area covered by the AUSCANNZUKUS security agreement have, over the years, caused considerable public concern.

=== Escalation following September 11, 2001 attacks ===
We will come together to strengthen our intelligence capabilities to know the plans of terrorists before they act and to find them before they strike.

— President Bush speaking in Congress on September 20, 2001

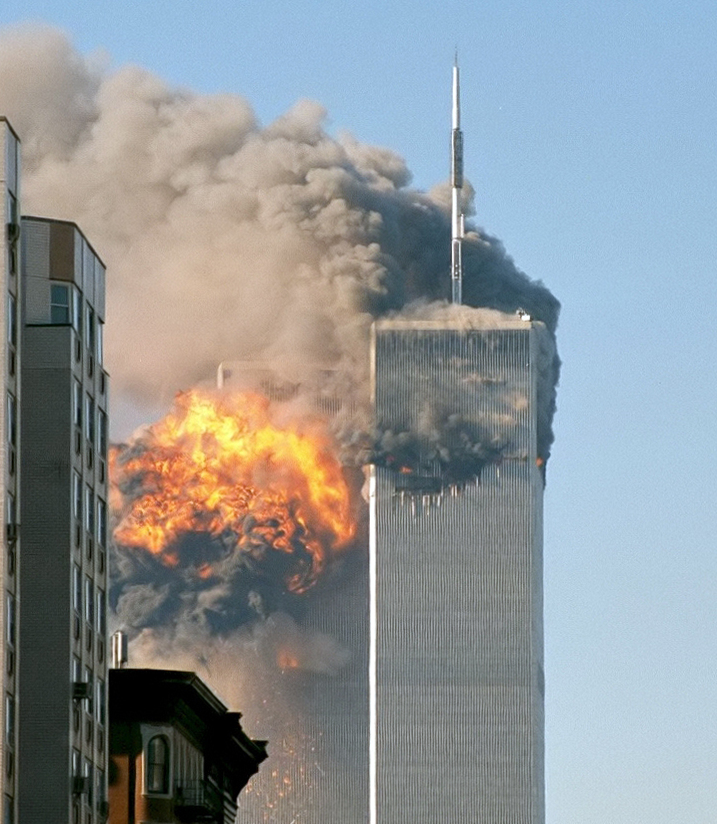
The September 11 attacks on the World Trade Center and the Pentagon led to major reforms of U.S. intelligence agencies, and paved the way for the establishment of the Director of National Intelligence position.

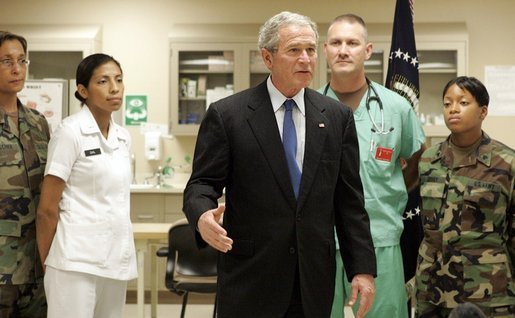
On 1 January 2006, days after The New York Times wrote that "Bush Lets U.S. Spy on Callers Without Courts, the President emphasized that "This is a limited program designed to prevent attacks on the United States of America. And I repeat, limited."

In the aftermath of the September 2001 attacks on the World Trade Center and the Pentagon, bulk domestic spying in the United States increased dramatically. The desire to prevent future attacks of this scale led to the passage of the Patriot Act. Later acts include the Protect America Act (which removes the warrant requirement for government surveillance of foreign targets) and the FISA Amendments Act (which relaxed some of the original FISA court requirements).

Follow-on legislation have amended and reauthorized the post-9/11 surveillance authorities. The USA FREEDOM Act of 2015 limited certain bulk collection authorized under the USA PATRIOT Act. Subsequent legislation reauthorized Section 702 of the Foreign Intelligence Surveillance Act, which allows for warrantless surveillance of non-U.S. persons located outside the United States and will sunset in April 2026 if not reauthorized by Congress.

In 2002, "Total Information Awareness" was established by the U.S. government in order to "revolutionize the ability of the United States to detect, classify and identify foreign terrorists".

In 2005, a report about President Bush's President's Surveillance Program appeared in The New York Times. According to reporters James Risen and Eric Lichtblau, the actual publication of their report was delayed for a year because "The White House asked The New York Times not to publish this article".

Also in 2005, the existence of STELLARWIND was revealed by Thomas Tamm. In 2006, Mark Klein revealed the existence of Room 641A that he had wired back in 2003. In 2008, Babak Pasdar, a computer security expert, and CEO of Bat Blue publicly revealed the existence of the "Quantico circuit", that he and his team found in 2003. He described it as a backdoor to the federal government in the systems of an unnamed wireless provider; the company was later independently identified as Verizon.

The NSA's database of American's phone calls was made public in 2006 by USA Today journalist Leslie Cauley in an article titled, "NSA has massive database of Americans' phone calls." The article cites anonymous sources that described the program's reach on American citizens:

... it means that the government has detailed records of calls they made — across town or across the country — to family members, co-workers, business contacts and others. The three telecommunications companies are working under contract with the NSA, which launched the program in 2001 shortly after the Sept. 11 terrorist attacks.

In 2009, The New York Times cited several anonymous intelligence officials alleging that "the N.S.A. made Americans targets in eavesdropping operations based on insufficient evidence tying them to terrorism" and "the N.S.A. tried to wiretap a member of Congress without a warrant".

=== Acceleration of media leaks (2010–present) ===
On 15 March 2012, the American magazine Wired published an article with the headline "The NSA Is Building the Country's Biggest Spy Center (Watch What You Say)", which was later mentioned by U.S. Rep. Hank Johnson during a congressional hearing. In response to Johnson's inquiry, NSA director Keith B. Alexander testified that these allegations made by Wired magazine were untrue:

Excerpt from Wired magazine's article originally published on 15 March 2012

Under construction by contractors with top-secret clearances, the blandly named Utah Data Center is being built for the National Security Agency. A project of immense secrecy, it is the final piece in a complex puzzle assembled over the past decade. Its purpose: to intercept, decipher, analyze, and store vast swaths of the world's communications as they zap down from satellites and zip through the underground and undersea cables of international, foreign, and domestic networks. The heavily fortified $2 billion center should be up and running in September 2013. Flowing through its servers and routers and stored in near-bottomless databases will be all forms of communication, including the complete contents of private emails, cell phone calls, and Google searches, as well as all sorts of personal data trails—parking receipts, travel itineraries, bookstore purchases, and other digital "pocket litter." It is, in some measure, the realization of the "total information awareness" program created during the first term of the Bush administration—an effort that was killed by Congress in 2003 after it caused an outcry over its potential for invading Americans' privacy. But "this is more than just a data center," says one senior intelligence official who until recently was involved with the program. The mammoth Bluffdale center will have another important and far more secret role that until now has gone unrevealed. It is also critical, he says, for breaking codes. And code-breaking is crucial, because much of the data that the center will handle—financial information, stock transactions, business deals, foreign military and diplomatic secrets, legal documents, confidential personal communications—will be heavily encrypted ...

NSA Director Keith Alexander's testimony to the United States Congress on 20 March 2012

Representative Johnson: "The author of the Wired magazine article, his name is James Bashford, [sic] he writes that NSA has software that "searches U.S. sources for target addresses, locations, countries and phone numbers as well as watchlisted names, keywords, and phrases in email. Any communication that arouses suspicion, especially those to or from the million or so people on the agency watchlists are automatically copied or recorded and then transmitted to the NSA." Is this true?"

General Alexander: "No, it's not. And that's from James Bashford? [sic]"
Rep. Johnson: "Yes. Does the NSA routinely intercept American citizens' emails?"
Gen. Alexander: "No."
Rep. Johnson: "Does the NSA intercept Americans' cell phone conversations?"
Gen. Alexander: "No."
Rep. Johnson: "Google searches?"
Gen. Alexander: "No."
Rep. Johnson: "Text messages?"
Gen. Alexander: "No."
Rep. Johnson: "Amazon.com orders?"
Gen. Alexander: "No."
Rep. Johnson: "Bank records?"
Gen. Alexander: "No."

=== 2013 mass surveillance disclosures ===
On 6 June 2013, Britain's The Guardian newspaper began publishing a series of revelations by an unnamed American whistleblower, revealed several days later to be former CIA and NSA-contracted systems analyst Edward Snowden. Snowden gave a cache of internal documents in support of his claims to two journalists: Glenn Greenwald and Laura Poitras, Greenwald later estimated that the cache contains 15,000–20,000 documents, some very large and very detailed, and some very small. This was one of the largest news leaks in the modern history of the United States. In over two months of publications, it became clear that the NSA operates a complex web of spying programs which allow it to intercept internet and telephone conversations from over a billion users from dozens of countries around the world. Specific revelations have been made about China, the European Union, Latin America, Iran and Pakistan, and Australia and New Zealand, however the published documentation reveals that many of the programs indiscriminately collect bulk information directly from central servers and internet backbones, which almost invariably carry and reroute information from distant countries.

Due to this central server and backbone monitoring, many of the programs overlap and interrelate among one another. These programs are often done with the assistance of US entities such as the United States Department of Justice and the FBI, are sanctioned by US laws such as the FISA Amendments Act, and the necessary court orders for them are signed by the secret Foreign Intelligence Surveillance Court. In addition to this, many of the NSA's programs are directly aided by national and foreign intelligence services, Britain's GCHQ and Australia's DSD, as well as by large private telecommunications and Internet corporations, such as Verizon, Telstra, Google and Facebook.

On 9 June 2013, Edward Snowden told The Guardian:

They (the NSA) can use the system to go back in time and scrutinize every decision you've ever made, every friend you've ever discussed something with, and attack you on that basis to sort of derive suspicion from an innocent life and paint anyone in the context of a wrongdoer.

— Edward Snowden

The US government has aggressively sought to dismiss and challenge Fourth Amendment cases raised: Hepting v. AT&T, Jewel v. NSA, Clapper v. Amnesty International, Al-Haramain Islamic Foundation v. Obama, and Center for Constitutional Rights v. Bush. The government has also granted retroactive immunity to ISPs and telecoms participating in domestic surveillance.

The US district court judge for the District of Columbia, Richard Leon, declared on December 16, 2013 that the mass collection of metadata of Americans' telephone records by the National Security Agency probably violates the Fourth Amendment prohibition of unreasonable searches and seizures.

Given the limited record before me at this point in the litigation – most notably, the utter lack of evidence that a terrorist attack has ever been prevented because searching the NSA database was faster than other investigative tactics – I have serious doubts about the efficacy of the metadata collection program as a means of conducting time-sensitive investigations in cases involving imminent threats of terrorism.

"Plaintiffs have a substantial likelihood of showing that their privacy interests outweigh the government's interest in collecting and analysing bulk telephony metadata and therefore the NSA's bulk collection program is indeed an unreasonable search under the fourth amendment," he wrote.

"The Fourth Amendment typically requires 'a neutral and detached authority be interposed between the police and the public,' and it is offended by 'general warrants' and laws that allow searches to be conducted 'indiscriminately and without regard to their connections with a crime under investigation,'" he wrote. He added:

I cannot imagine a more 'indiscriminate' and 'arbitrary invasion' than this systematic and high-tech collection and retention of personal data on virtually every single citizen for purposes of querying and analyzing it without prior judicial approval. Surely such a program infringes on 'that degree of privacy' that the founders enshrined in the Fourth Amendment. Indeed I have little doubt that the author of our Constitution, James Madison, who cautioned us to beware 'the abridgement of freedom of the people by gradual and silent encroachments by those in power,' would be aghast.

Leon granted the request for a preliminary injunction that blocks the collection of phone data for two private plaintiffs (Larry Klayman, a conservative lawyer, and Charles Strange, father of a cryptologist killed in Afghanistan when his helicopter was shot down in 2011) and ordered the government to destroy any of their records that have been gathered. But the judge stayed action on his ruling pending a government appeal, recognizing in his 68-page opinion the "significant national security interests at stake in this case and the novelty of the constitutional issues."

=== Legislation in 2014 and 2015 ===
On 20 May 2014, U.S. Representative for Michigan's 8th congressional district Republican congressman Mike Rogers introduced the Intelligence Authorization Act for Fiscal Years 2014 and 2015 with the goal of authorizing appropriations for fiscal years 2014 and 2015 for intelligence and intelligence-related activities of the United States Government, the Community Management Account, and the Central Intelligence Agency (CIA) Retirement and Disability System, and for other purposes. Versions of the bill were passed into law for FY2014 and FY2015.

The USA Freedom Act was signed into law on June 2, 2015, the day after certain provisions of the Patriot Act had expired. It mandated an end to bulk collection of phone call metadata by the NSA within 180 days, but allowed continued mandatory retention of metadata by phone companies with access by the government with case-by-case approval from the Foreign Intelligence Surveillance Court. Later audits and a management decision led to a suspension and cancellation of the Call Detail Records program, with the government oversight bodies determining it had a low yield of unique information.

Section 215 of the USA PATRIOT Act had previously been used to justify the bulk collection of domestic telephone metadata by the National Security Agency. Two later oversight reviews of the use of this authority examined its operations and its value, the Privacy and Civil Liberties Oversight Board found that the Section 215 bulk metadata program had "yielded limited unique counterterrorism value" and "often duplicated information more efficiently obtained by targeted investigations.

=== 2020s ===
The 2020s are seeing even more surveillance on Americans by utilizing a loophole left in the Fourth Amendment in tandem with increased artificial intelligence or AI capabilities. The increasing utilization of AI in surveillance applications is best illustrated by reports such as Anthropic's AI model Claude being used in the raid on Venezuela. Shortly after the raid, CEO of Anthropic Dario Amodei warned their technologies could be used on American citizens as permitted by the Fourth Amendment's loophole to produce a comprehensive profile on Americans " automatically and at massive scale." Additionally, organizations such as the Electronic Frontier Foundation, a digital rights group, have already spoken out against companies such as Flock Safety, a surveillance company, for their utilization of these same AI surveillance technologies. The organization notably takes issue with how Flock's policing tools are often utilized, such as when their tracing tools were deployed against protestors during the No Kings Protests.

=== Second Trump presidency ===
The second Trump administration has sought state data and consolidated historically isolated federal data. The Justice Department has sought state voter data. The Department of Government Efficiency has collected data seeking access to IRS, Social Security, Selective Service, Medicare, Health and Human Services, Securities and Exchange Commission, National Labor Relations Board, and student data. DHS has expanded its surveillance particularly to enable the administration's immigration priorities. This follows from DHS's earlier use of databases in the 2010s to profile Latino Americans and contribute to "self-deportation" techniques or physical deportations by way of the DHS gang databases.

== Modalities, concepts, and methods ==
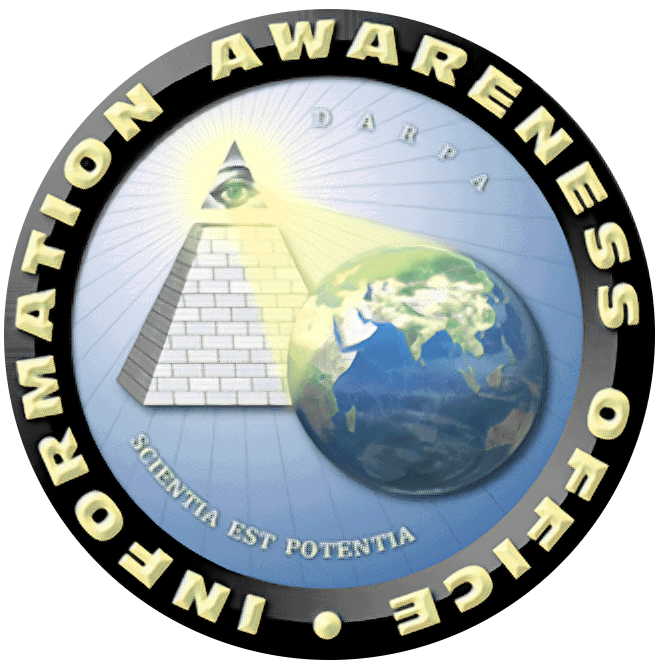
Official seal of the Information Awareness Office – a U.S. agency which developed technologies for mass surveillance

=== Logging postal mail ===
Under the Mail Isolation Control and Tracking program, the U.S. Postal Service photographs the exterior of every piece of paper mail that is processed in the United States — about 160 billion pieces in 2012. The U.S. Postmaster General stated that the system is primarily used for mail sorting, but the images are available for possible use by law enforcement agencies. Created in 2001 following the anthrax attacks that killed five people, it is a sweeping expansion of a 100-year-old program called "mail cover" which targets people suspected of crimes. Together, the two programs show that postal mail is subject to the same kind of scrutiny that the National Security Agency gives to telephone calls, e-mail, and other forms of electronic communication.

Mail cover surveillance requests are granted for about 30 days, and can be extended for up to 120 days. Images captured under the Mail Isolation Control and Tracking program are retained for a week to 30 days and then destroyed. There are two kinds of mail covers: those related to criminal activity and those requested to protect national security. Criminal activity requests average 15,000 to 20,000 per year, while the number of requests for national security mail covers has not been made public. Neither the Mail Isolation Control and Tracking program nor the mail cover program require prior approval by a judge. For both programs the information gathered is metadata from the outside of the envelope or package for which courts have said there is no expectation of privacy. Opening the mail to view its contents would require a warrant approved by a judge.

=== Wiretapping ===
Billions of dollars per year are spent, by agencies such as the Information Awareness Office, National Security Agency, and the Federal Bureau of Investigation, to develop, purchase, implement, and operate systems such as Carnivore, ECHELON, and NarusInsight to intercept and analyze the immense amount of data that traverses the Internet and telephone system every day.

The Total Information Awareness program, of the Information Awareness Office, was formed in 2002 by the Pentagon and led by former rear admiral John Poindexter. The program designed numerous technologies to be used to perform mass surveillance. Examples include advanced speech-to-text programs (so that phone conversations can be monitored en-masse by a computer, instead of requiring human operators to listen to them), social network analysis software to monitor groups of people and their interactions with each other, and "Human identification at a distance" software which allows computers to identify people on surveillance cameras by their facial features and gait (the way they walk). The program was later renamed "Terrorism Information Awareness", after a negative public reaction.

==== Legal foundations ====
The Communications Assistance for Law Enforcement Act (CALEA), passed in 1994, requires that all U.S. telecommunications companies modify their equipment to allow easy wiretapping of telephone, VoIP, and broadband Internet traffic.

In 1999 two models of mandatory data retention were suggested for the US. The first model would record the IP address assigned to a customer at a specific time. In the second model, "which is closer to what Europe adopted", telephone numbers dialed, contents of Web pages visited, and recipients of e-mail messages must be retained by the ISP for an unspecified amount of time. In 2006 the International Association of Chiefs of Police adopted a resolution calling for a "uniform data retention mandate" for "customer subscriber information and source and destination information." The U.S. Department of Justice announced in 2011 that criminal investigations "are being frustrated" because no law currently exists to force Internet providers to keep track of what their customers are doing.

The Electronic Frontier Foundation was involved in a lawsuit (Hepting v. AT&T) against the telecom giant AT&T Inc. for its assistance to the U.S. government in monitoring the communications of millions of American citizens. Recently the documents, which were exposed by a whistleblower who had previously worked for AT&T, and showed schematics of the massive data mining system, were made public.

==== Internet communications ====
The FBI developed the computer programs "Magic Lantern" and CIPAV, which it can remotely install on a computer system, in order to monitor a person's computer activity.

The NSA has been gathering information on financial records, Internet surfing habits, and monitoring e-mails. It has also performed extensive surveillance on social networks such as Facebook. Recently, Facebook has revealed that, in the last six months of 2012, they handed over the private data of between 18,000 and 19,000 users to law enforcement of all types—including local police and federal agencies, such as the FBI, Federal Marshals and the NSA. One form of wiretapping utilized by the NSA is RADON, a bi-directional host tap that can inject Ethernet packets onto the same target. It allows bi-directional exploitation of Denied networks using standard on-net tools. The one limitation of RADON is that it is a USB device that requires a physical connection to a laptop or PC to work. RADON was created by a Massachusetts firm called Netragard. Their founder, Adriel Desautels, said about RADON, "it is our 'safe' malware. RADON is designed to enable us to infect customer systems in a safe and controllable manner. Safe means that every strand is built with an expiration date that, when reached, results in RADON performing an automatic and clean self-removal."

The NSA is also known to have splitter sites in the United States. Splitter sites are places where a copy of every packet is directed to a secret room where it is analyzed by the Narus STA 6400, a deep packet inspection device. Although the only known location is at 611 Folsom Street, San Francisco, California, expert analysis of Internet traffic suggests that there are likely several locations throughout the United States.

==== Advertising data ====
In September 2022 the EFF and AP revealed their investigation into the use of advertising IDs to develop the Fog Reveal database. Fog Reveal aggregates location data from mobile applications, which is then supplied as a service to United States law enforcement agencies.

==== Intelligence apparatus to monitor Americans ====
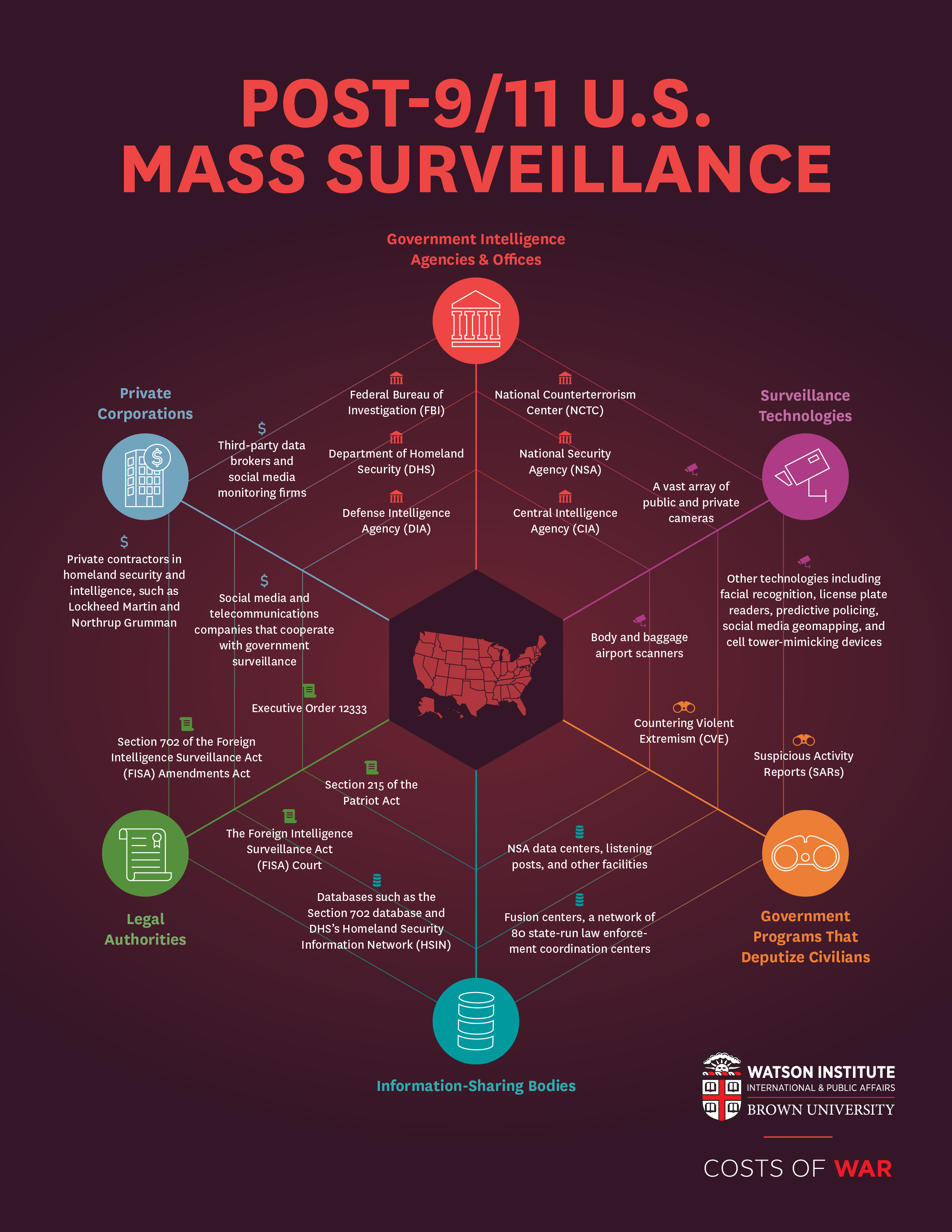
Infographic showing the extent of U.S. mass surveillance after 9/11

Since the September 11 attacks, a vast domestic intelligence apparatus has been built to collect information using FBI, local police, state homeland security offices and military criminal investigators. The intelligence apparatus collects, analyzes and stores information about millions of (if not all) American citizens, most of whom have not been accused of any wrongdoing. Every state and local law enforcement agency is to feed information to federal authorities to support the work of the FBI.

The PRISM special source operation system was enabled by the Protect America Act of 2007 under President Bush and the FISA Amendments Act of 2008, which legally immunized private companies that cooperated voluntarily with US intelligence collection and was renewed by Congress under President Obama in 2012 for five years until December 2017. According to The Register, the FISA Amendments Act of 2008 "specifically authorizes intelligence agencies to monitor the phone, email, and other communications of U.S. citizens for up to a week without obtaining a warrant" when one of the parties is outside the U.S.

PRISM was first publicly revealed on 6 June 2013, after classified documents about the program were leaked to The Washington Post and The Guardian by Edward Snowden.

==== Telephones ====
In early 2006, USA Today reported that several major telephone companies were cooperating illegally with the National Security Agency to monitor the phone records of U.S. citizens, and storing them in a large database known as the NSA call database. This report came on the heels of allegations that the U.S. government had been conducting electronic surveillance of domestic telephone calls without warrants.

Law enforcement and intelligence services in the United States possess technology to remotely activate the microphones in cell phones in order to listen to conversations that take place nearby the person who holds the phone.

U.S. federal agents regularly use mobile phones to collect location data. The geographical location of a mobile phone (and thus the person carrying it) can be determined easily (whether it is being used or not), using a technique known multilateration to calculate the differences in time for a signal to travel from the cell phone to each of several cell towers near the owner of the phone.

In 2013, the existence of the Hemisphere Project, through which AT&T provides call detail records to government agencies, became publicly known.

==== Infiltration of smartphones ====
As worldwide sales of smartphones began exceeding those of feature phones, the NSA decided to take advantage of the smartphone boom. This is particularly advantageous because the smartphone combines a myriad of data that would interest an intelligence agency, such as social contacts, user behavior, interests, location, photos and credit card numbers and passwords.

An internal NSA report from 2010 stated that the spread of the smartphone has been occurring "extremely rapidly"—developments that "certainly complicate traditional target analysis." According to the document, the NSA has set up task forces assigned to several smartphone manufacturers and operating systems, including Apple Inc.'s iPhone and iOS operating system, as well as Google's Android mobile operating system. Similarly, Britain's GCHQ assigned a team to study and crack the BlackBerry.

Under the heading "iPhone capability", the document notes that there are smaller NSA programs, known as "scripts", that can perform surveillance on 38 different features of the iPhone 3 and iPhone 4 operating systems. These include the mapping feature, voicemail and photos, as well as Google Earth, Facebook and Yahoo! Messenger.

===== Stingray devices =====
The use of stingrays by United States law enforcement is an investigative technique used by both federal and local law enforcement in the United States to obtain information from cell phones by mimicking a cell phone tower. The devices which accomplish this are generically known as IMSI-catchers, but are commonly called stingrays, a brand sold by the Harris Corporation.

=== Data mining of subpoenaed records ===
Law enforcement agencies have expanded their surveillance capabilities through the automated analysis of various personal data in big data analytics which includes predictive policing systems to support investigative and patrol activities.

The FBI collected nearly all hotel, airline, rental car, gift shop, and casino records in Las Vegas during the last two weeks of 2003. The FBI requested all electronic data of hundreds of thousands of people based on a very general lead for the Las Vegas New Year's celebration. The Senior VP of The Mirage went on record with PBS' Frontline describing the first time they were requested to help in the mass collection of personal information.

=== Surveillance cameras ===
Wide-area motion imagery (WAMI), also known as wide-area persistent surveillance, is a form of airborne surveillance system that collects pattern-of-life data by recording motion images of an area larger than a city – in sub-meter resolution. This video allows for anyone within the field of regard to be tracked – both live and retroactively, for forensic analysis. The use of sophisticated tracking algorithms applied to the WAMI dataset also enables mass automated geo-location tracking of every vehicle and pedestrian. WAMI sensors are typically mounted on crewed airplanes, drones, blimps and aerostats. WAMI is currently in use on the southern border of the US and in the past has been deployed in Baltimore, Dayton, and Compton, California in 2012. An aerial motion imagery surveillance system was deployed more narrowly in Lancaster, California starting in 2012. WAMI systems such as ARGUS WAMI are capable of live viewing and recording a 68 square mile area with enough detail to view pedestrians and vehicles and generate chronographs. These WAMI cameras, such as Gorgon Stare, Angelfire, Hiper Stare, Hawkeye and ARGUS, create airborne video so detailed that pedestrians can be followed across the city through forensic analysis. This allows investigators to rewind and playback the movements of anyone within this 68 square mile area for hours, days or even months at a time depending on the airframe the WAMI sensors are mounted on. JLENS, a surveillance aerostat scheduled for deployment over the east coast of the US, is a form of WAMI that uses sophisticated radar imaging along with electro-optical WAMI sensors to enable mass geo-location tracking of ground vehicles.

There has been some resistance to the domestic deployment of WAMI. Its use in Compton, California was intentionally hidden from the public, including from the mayor, because the sheriff's department believed many people would object to the program. The Compton program was revealed and publicized by the American Civil Liberties Union, Teame Zazzu, and The Center for Investigative Reporting.

After becoming aware of the deployment of WAMI system in her jurisdiction, Compton Mayor Aja Brown proposed requiring that the public be notified before authorities implement monitoring equipment.

PeSEAS and PerMIATE software automate and record the movement observed in the WAMI video. This technology uses software to track and record the movements of pedestrians and vehicles using automatic object recognition software across the entire frame, generating "tracklets" or chronographs of every car and pedestrian movements. 24/7 deployment of this technology has been suggested by the DHS on spy blimps such as the recently killed Blue Devil Airship.

Traffic cameras, which were meant to help enforce traffic laws at intersections, have also sparked some controversy, due to their use by law enforcement agencies for purposes unrelated to traffic violations. These cameras also work as transit choke-points that allow individuals inside the vehicle to be positively identified and license plate data to be collected and time stamped for cross reference with airborne WAMI such as ARGUS and HAWKEYE used by police and Law Enforcement.

The Department of Homeland Security is funding networks of surveillance cameras in cities and towns as part of its efforts to combat terrorism. In February 2009, Cambridge, MA rejected the cameras due to privacy concerns.

In July 2020, the Electronic Frontier Foundation (EFF) reported that the San Francisco Police Department (SFPD) used a camera network in the city's Business Improvement District amid protests against police violence. The report claims that the SFPD's usage of the camera network went beyond investigating footage, likening the department's access to real-time video feeds as "indiscriminate surveillance of protestors."

=== Surveillance drones ===
Three police surveillance drones overhead at the 2026 Delaney Hall protests shortly before riot police were deployed

On 19 June 2013, FBI Director Robert Mueller told the United States Senate Committee on the Judiciary that the federal government had been employing surveillance drones on U.S. soil in "particular incidents". According to Mueller, the FBI was in the initial stage of developing drone policies.

Earlier in 2012, Congress passed a US$63 billion bill that will grant four years of additional funding to the Federal Aviation Administration (FAA). Under the bill, the FAA is required to provide military and commercial drones with expanded access to U.S. airspace by October 2015.

In February 2013, a spokesman for the Los Angeles Police Department explained that these drones would initially be deployed in large public gatherings, including major protests. Over time, tiny drones would be used to fly inside buildings to track down suspects and assist in investigations. According to The Los Angeles Times, the main advantage of using drones is that they offer "unblinking eye-in-the-sky coverage". They can be modified to carry high-resolution video cameras, infrared sensors, license plate readers, listening devices, and be disguised as sea gulls or other birds to mask themselves.

The FBI and Customs and Border Protection have used drones for surveillance of protests by the Black Lives Matter movement.

=== Infiltration of activist groups ===
In 2003, consent decrees against surveillance around the country were lifted, with the assistance of the Justice Department.

The New York City Police Department infiltrated and compiled dossiers on protest groups before the 2004 Republican National Convention, leading to over 1,800 arrests and subsequent fingerprinting.

In 2008, Maryland State Police infiltrated local peace groups.

In 2013, a Washington, D.C. undercover cop infiltrated peace groups.

The Intercept claimed that in 2020, the Federal Bureau of Investigation (FBI) paid an informant to pose as organizer in Denver, Colorado during the George Floyd protests. This informant particularly infiltrated and undermined protest movements by accusing other genuine activists of being FBI informants.

During the 2026 Delaney Hall protests, undercover Newark Police Department detectives infiltrated the protests to make a targeted arrest in collaboration with Immigration and Customs Enforcement (ICE). FBI agents contacted protesters who had been arrested in an attempt to gather information about protesters. The FBI also contacted the families and friends of arrested protesters, and FBI agents performed knock and talks at protester homes. The Intercept characterized this as the FBI trying to "flip" protesters into informants, and public defenders representing the arrestees argued this violated the protesters' rights to legal representation.

=== International cooperation ===
The "five eyes" of Australia, Canada, New Zealand, the United Kingdom and the United States

During World War II, the BRUSA Agreement was signed by the governments of the United States and the United Kingdom for the purpose of intelligence sharing. This was later formalized in the UKUSA Agreement of 1946 as a secret treaty. The full text of the agreement was released to the public on 25 June 2010.

Although the treaty was later revised to include other countries such as Denmark, Germany, Ireland, Norway, Turkey, and the Philippines, most of the information sharing is performed by the so-called "Five Eyes", a term referring to the following English-speaking western democracies and their respective intelligence agencies:

- – The Defence Signals Directorate of Australia
- – The Communications Security Establishment of Canada
- – The Government Communications Security Bureau of New Zealand
- – The Government Communications Headquarters of the United Kingdom, which is widely considered to be a leader in traditional spying due to its influence on countries that were once part of the British Empire.
- – The National Security Agency of the United States, which has the biggest budget and some of the most advanced technical abilities among the "five eyes".

In 2013, media disclosures revealed how other government agencies have cooperated extensively with the "Five Eyes":

- – The Politiets Efterretningstjeneste (PET) of Denmark, a domestic intelligence agency, exchanges data with the NSA on a regular basis, as part of a secret agreement with the United States.
- – The Bundesnachrichtendienst (Federal Intelligence Service) of Germany systematically transfers metadata from German intelligence sources to the NSA. In December 2012 alone, Germany provided the NSA with 500 million metadata records. The NSA granted the Bundesnachrichtendienst access to X-Keyscore, in exchange for Mira4 and Veras. In early 2013, Hans-Georg Maaßen, President of the German domestic security agency BfV, made several visits to the headquarters of the NSA. According to classified documents of the German government, Maaßen had agreed to transfer all data collected by the BfV via XKeyscore to the NSA. In addition, the BfV has been working very closely with eight other U.S. government agencies, including the CIA.
- – The SIGINT National Unit of Israel routinely receives raw intelligence data (including those of U.S. citizens) from the NSA. (See also: Memorandum of understanding between the NSA and Israel)
- – The Algemene Inlichtingen en Veiligheidsdienst (General Intelligence and Security Service) of the Netherlands has been receiving and storing user information gathered by U.S. intelligence sources such as PRISM.
- – The Defence Ministry of Singapore and its Security and Intelligence Division have been secretly intercepting much of the fibre optic cable traffic passing through the Asian continent. Information gathered by the Government of Singapore is transferred to the Government of Australia as part of an intelligence sharing agreement. This allows the "Five Eyes" to maintain a "stranglehold on communications across the Eastern Hemisphere".
- – The National Defence Radio Establishment of Sweden (codenamed Sardines) has been working extensively with the NSA, and it has granted the "five eyes" access to underwater cables in the Baltic Sea.
- – The Federal Intelligence Service (FSI) of Switzerland regularly exchanges information with the NSA, based on a secret agreement. In addition, the NSA has been granted access to Swiss monitoring facilities in Leuk (canton of Valais) and Herrenschwanden (canton of Bern).

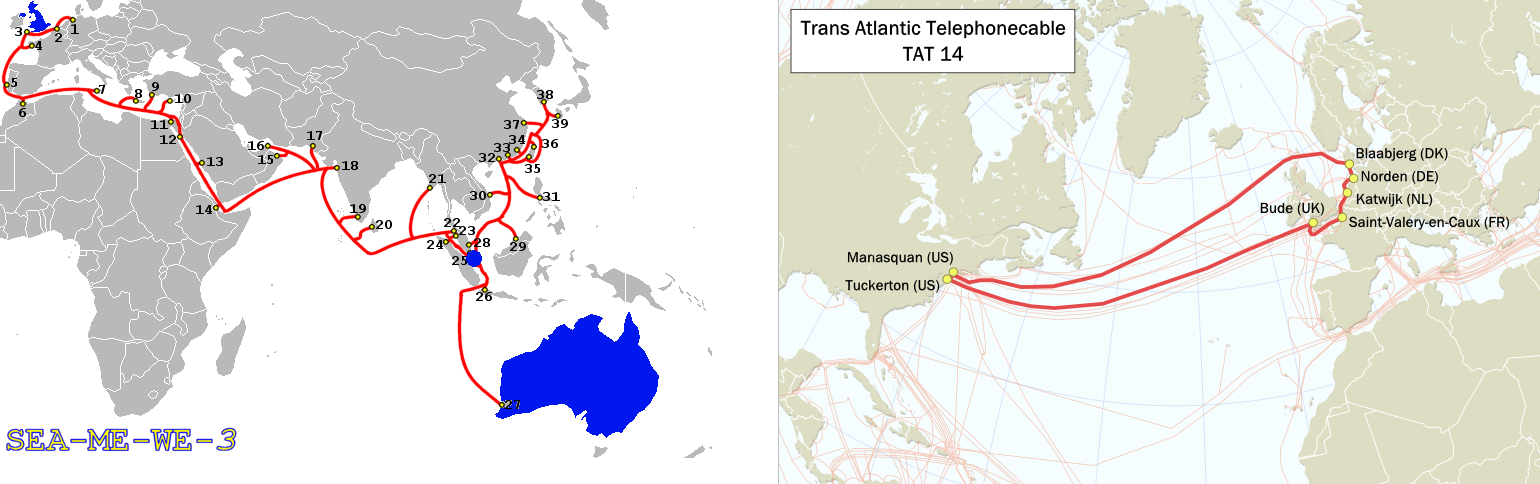
Top secret documents leaked by Edward Snowden revealed that the "Five Eyes" have gained access to the majority of Internet and telephone communications flowing throughout Europe, the United States, and other parts of the world. Left: SEA-ME-WE 3, which runs across the Afro-Eurasian supercontinent from Japan to Northern Germany, is one of the most important submarine cables accessed by the "Five Eyes". Singapore, a former British colony in the Asia-Pacific region (blue dot), plays a vital role in intercepting Internet and telecommunications traffic heading from Australia/Japan to Europe, and vice versa. An intelligence sharing agreement between Singapore and Australia allows the rest of the "Five Eyes" to gain access to SEA-ME-WE 3. Right:TAT-14, a telecommunications cable linking Europe with the United States, was identified as one of few assets of "Critical Infrastructure and Key Resources" of the USA on foreign territory. In 2013, it was revealed that British officials "pressured a handful of telecommunications and internet companies" to allow the British government to gain access to TAT-14.

Aside from the "Five Eyes", most other Western countries are also participating in the NSA surveillance system and sharing information with each other. However, being a partner of the NSA does not automatically exempt a country from being targeted by the NSA. According to an internal NSA document leaked by Snowden, "We (the NSA) can, and often do, target the signals of most 3rd party foreign partners."

Examples of members of the "Five Eyes" spying for each other:

- On behalf of the British Prime Minister Margaret Thatcher, the Security Intelligence Service of Canada spied on two British cabinet ministers in 1983.
- The U.S. National Security Agency spied on and intercepted the phone calls of Princess Diana right until she died in a Paris car crash with Dodi Fayed in 1997. The NSA currently holds 1,056 pages of classified information about Princess Diana, which cannot be released to the public because their disclosure is expected to cause "exceptionally grave damage" to the national security of the United States due to details regarding intelligence gathering capabilities.

== Uses of intercepted data ==
Most of the NSA's collected data which was seen by human eyes (i.e., used by NSA operatives) was used in accordance with the stated objective of combating terrorism.

In addition to combatting terrorism, these surveillance programs have been employed to assess the foreign policy and economic stability of other countries.

According to reports by Brazil's O Globo newspaper, the collected data was also used to target "commercial secrets". In a statement addressed to the National Congress of Brazil, journalist Glenn Greenwald testified that the U.S. government uses counter-terrorism as a "pretext" for clandestine surveillance in order to compete with other countries in the "business, industrial and economic fields".

In an interview with Der Spiegel published on 12 August 2013, former NSA Director Michael Hayden admitted that "We [the NSA] steal secrets. We're number one in it". Hayden also added that "We steal stuff to make you safe, not to make you rich".

According to documents seen by the news agency Reuters, information obtained in this way is subsequently funnelled to authorities across the nation to help them launch criminal investigations of Americans. Federal agents are then instructed to "recreate" the investigative trail in order to "cover up" where the information originated, known as parallel construction. (Were the true origins known, the evidence and resulting case might be invalidated as "fruit of the poisonous tree", a legal doctrine designed to deter abuse of power that prevents evidence or subsequent events being used in a case if they resulted from a search or other process that does not conform to legal requirements.)

According to NSA Chief Compliance Officer John DeLong, most violations of the NSA's rules were self-reported, and most often involved spying on personal love interests using surveillance technology of the agency.

Most agricultural surveillance is not covert and is carried out by government agencies such as APHIS (USDA's Animal and Plant Health Inspection Service). DHS has lamented the limited surveillance coverage provided by these inspections and works to augment this protection with their own resources.

== See also ==
- Censorship in the United States
- Domain Awareness System
- Freedom of speech in the United States
- Global surveillance
- Internet censorship in the United States
- Labor spying in the United States
- List of Americans under surveillance
- List of government mass surveillance projects
- Mass surveillance in the United Kingdom
- Police surveillance in New York City
