= Hemisphere Project =

United States counternarcotics program

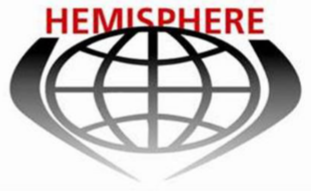
Hemisphere Project logo

The Hemisphere Project, also known as Hemisphere (codenamed Hudson Hawk), is a mass surveillance program conducted by U.S. telecommunications company AT&T and funded by the White House Office of National Drug Control Policy and the Drug Enforcement Administration (DEA).

== Overview ==
Hemisphere is a public–private partnership between the White House's Office of National Drug Control Policy (ONDCP) and AT&T, the third-largest provider of mobile telephone services in the US. In 2013 the program was overseen by AT&T employees embedded within the Atlanta head office (two employees) and Houston and Los Angeles regional offices (one employee each) of the ONDCP's High Intensity Drug Trafficking Area (HIDTA) program; these employees' salaries are paid through the ONDCP's HIDTA program, as opposed to by AT&T.

AT&T collects metadata relating to all calls routed through AT&T's exchanges, including calls made from non-AT&T handsets. The data collected include the phone numbers of the caller and recipient, the date, time and length of calls and, in some cases, a caller's location. An estimated four billion new call detail records are created on AT&T's database every day, though it is possible for a call to be recorded more than once. As AT&T maintains records of calls placed as well as calls received, a single call may be recorded against both the caller's telephone number (as an outgoing call) and the recipient's telephone number (as an incoming call); the number of records generated for a single call depends on its length, as well as on participants' locations and whether or not they are moving. Call detail records held as part of the project date back as far as 1987.

Data are typically forwarded to investigators by email in response to administrative subpoenas, which the DEA is authorized to issue independently of the courts. As the existence of the project is officially secret, investigators are not permitted to disclose the source of any intelligence obtained through the Hemisphere Project in case reports, court filings or other documents. Official guidance instead requires all intelligence be cited as “information obtained from an AT&T subpoena”.

Requests for urgent information from the project database take as little as an hour to fulfill.

== History ==
The partnership between AT&T and the Office of National Drug Control Policy (ONDCP) commenced in 2007, and data within the Hemisphere Project database extends as far back as 1987. In September 2013, an unnamed law enforcement official mentioned that they rarely needed to access data older than 18 months.

In 2013, activist Drew Hendricks brought the Hemisphere Project to public attention by obtaining a verified 27-slide PowerPoint presentation labeled "law enforcement sensitive" through a Freedom of Information Act (FOIA) request. This presentation included lists of individuals identified as suspects based on data from the project's database. While law enforcement initially portrayed the project as primarily focused on monitoring and collecting call records related to drug-related activities in standard criminal investigations, it included individuals unrelated to drug offenses. These individuals encompassed cases such as a person impersonating a military general, injuring an intelligence officer at a San Diego Navy facility; a South Carolina resident accused of making bomb threats; and a group involved in a theft incident at a Los Angeles jewelry store.

The White House contended that the Hemisphere Project's data did not raise privacy concerns, although Jameel Jaffer of the American Civil Liberties Union (ACLU) expressed skepticism regarding this claim.

The program led to discussions drawing parallels with legislative suggestions made in response to the revelations related to the "Planning Tool for Resource Integration, Synchronization, and Management" (PRISM). Notably, Representative Adam Schiff proposed a solution wherein phone companies would retain their data.

Spokespeople for Sprint, Verizon, and T-Mobile USA would not comment on whether their companies offered similar services.

== Surveillance concerns ==
In November 2023, a WIRED report disclosed that the Hemisphere Project, now known as Data Analytical Services (DAS), has facilitated access to an unprecedented volume of domestic phone records within the United States, even for individuals unconnected to criminal activities. This government initiative, in collaboration with AT&T, has raised significant legal and privacy concerns, allowing federal, state, and local enforcement agencies to scrutinize trillions of domestic phone records.

U.S. Senator Ron Wyden, in a letter dated November 20, 2023, addressed to U.S. Attorney General Merrick Garland, called for the release of additional information regarding the Hemisphere Project. He expressed profound reservations about the program's legality, revealing that it has provided law enforcement authorities with the ability to conduct extensive searches of domestic phone records, often without the need for warrants.

The WIRED report cites the concerns raised by U.S. Senator Ron Wyden providing insight into the Hemisphere Project's data access and its legal implications.

== See also ==
- Mass surveillance in the United States
