= Narus Inc. =

U.S. technology company

- Type: Subsidiary
- Industry: Software
- Founded: 1997
- Defunct: 2014
- Headquarters: Sunnyvale, California, United States
- Number of locations: United States, India
- Products: Originally a company focused on telecommunications billing and customer market intelligence. After 2001 the company pivoted towards providing network intelligence gathering software to governments around the world.
- Parent: Gen Digital

Narus Inc. was an American software company and vendor of big data analytics for cybersecurity.

== History ==
In 1997, Ori Cohen, Vice President of Business and Technology Development for VDONet, founded Narus with Stas Khirman in Israel. Presently, they are employed with Deutsche Telekom AG and are not members of Narus' executive team. In 2010, Narus became a subsidiary of Boeing, located in Sunnyvale, California. In 2015, Narus was sold to Symantec.

== Management ==
In 2004, Narus employed former Deputy Director of the National Security Agency, William Crowell as a director.

== Narus software ==
Narus software primarily captures various computer network traffic in real-time and analyzes results.

Before 9/11 Narus built carrier-grade tools to analyze IP network traffic for billing purposes, to prevent what Narus called "revenue leakage". Post-9/11 Narus added more "semantic monitoring abilities" for surveillance.

=== Mobile ===
Narus provided Telecom Egypt with deep packet inspection equipment, a content-filtering technology that allows network managers to inspect, track and target content from users of the Internet and mobile phones, as it passes through routers. The national telecommunications authorities of both Pakistan and Saudi Arabia are global Narus customers.

== Controversies ==
=== AT&T wiretapping room ===
Narus supplied the software and hardware used at AT&T wiretapping rooms, according to whistleblowers Thomas Drake and Mark Klein.

== See also ==
- Carnivore (software)
- Communications Assistance For Law Enforcement Act
- Computer surveillance
- ECHELON
- Hepting vs. AT&T, the 2006 lawsuit in which the Electronic Frontier Foundation alleges AT&T allowed the NSA to tap the entirety of its clients' Internet and voice over IP communications using Narus equipment.
- Lincoln (surveillance)
- Room 641A
- SIGINT
- Total Information Awareness
- Verint Systems
