= Litigation over global surveillance =

Litigation over global surveillance has occurred in multiple jurisdictions since the global surveillance disclosures of 2013.

== Background ==
Ongoing news reports in the international media have revealed operational details about the U.S. National Security Agency (NSA) and its international partners' global surveillance of foreign nationals and U.S. citizens. The reports emanate from a cache of top secret documents leaked by ex-NSA contractor Edward Snowden. In June 2013, the first of Snowden's documents were published simultaneously by The Washington Post and The Guardian, attracting considerable public attention.

== North America ==
=== Hepting v. AT&T ===
Hepting v. AT&T is a US class action lawsuit filed in January 2006 by the Electronic Frontier Foundation (EFF) against the telecommunications company AT&T, in which the EFF alleges that AT&T permitted and assisted the National Security Agency (NSA) in unlawfully monitoring the communications of the United States, including AT&T customers, businesses and third parties whose communications were routed through AT&T's network, as well as voice over IP telephone calls routed via the Internet.

The case is separate from, but related to, the NSA warrantless surveillance controversy, in which the federal government agency bypassed the courts to monitor U.S. phone calls without warrants. Hepting v. AT&T does not include the federal government as a party.

=== Jewel v. NSA ===
Jewel v. National Security Agency is a United States class action lawsuit filed by the Electronic Frontier Foundation (EFF) against the National Security Agency (NSA) and several high-ranking officials of the administration for 43rd U.S. president George W. Bush, charging an "illegal and unconstitutional program of dragnet communications surveillance".

=== Clapper v. Amnesty International ===
Clapper v. Amnesty International, 568 U.S. ___ (2013), was a United States Supreme Court case in which the Court held that Amnesty International USA and others lacked standing to challenge 50 U. S. C. §1881a of the Foreign Intelligence Surveillance Act as amended by the Foreign Intelligence Surveillance Act of 1978 Amendments Act of 2008.

=== Klayman v. Obama ===
The plaintiffs, subscribers of Verizon Wireless, brought suit against the NSA, the United States Department of Justice, President Obama, Attorney General Eric Holder, General Keith Alexander, and Verizon Communication. The plaintiffs allege that the government is conducting a "secret and illegal government scheme to intercept vast quantities of domestic telephonic communications".

On December 16, 2013, United States District Court for the District of Columbia Judge Richard J. Leon ruled that bulk collection of American telephone metadata likely violates the Constitution of the United States. The judge wrote, "I cannot imagine a more 'indiscriminate' and 'arbitrary' invasion than this systematic and high-tech collection and retention of personal data on virtually every single citizen for purposes of querying and analyzing it without prior judicial approval ... Surely, such a program infringes on 'that degree of privacy' that the founders enshrined in the Fourth Amendment."

=== ACLU v. Clapper ===
The American Civil Liberties Union and its affiliates brought suit challenging the legality of the NSA's bulk data collection program. The district court granted a dismissal, and the plaintiffs announced their intention to appeal the decision to the Second Circuit court of Appeals.

ACLU v Clapper was heard before the Second Circuit on May 7, 2015. The Second Circuit did not address the constitutionality of the data collection program, but did find that the implementation of the mass surveillance program being authorized by section 215 of the Patriot Act was illegal. The court also found ACLU had alleged a concrete, fairly traceable, and redressable injury sufficient to confer standing to assert their First Amendment rights, based on an infringement of freedom of speech and freedom of association.

=== Paul v. Obama ===
In February 2015, Paul filed suit against the federal government NSA spying program in a suit titled Paul v. Obama. The suit is expected to be a drawn out process, and Paul stressed his intent is not to harm the intelligence capacity or American government in any way, but simply to restore the country to the Constitutional protections that have ensured her stability.

The case was stayed pending the appeal of the court's order in a related case, Klayman v. Obama (Civil Action No. 13-cv-851), which was resolved on June 8, 2016. Since there had been no motion to lift the stay or other activity for nearly two years, the Court issued an Order on March 5, 2018, requiring plaintiff to show cause in writing, by April 4, 2018, as to why this case should not be dismissed for want of prosecution. The case was dismissed without prejudice on February 7, 2019, because the plaintiff failed to respond to the Court's Order to Show Cause within the time prescribed by the court.

=== United States v. Moalin ===
United States v. Moalin is a court case that was heard and decided by the United States Court of Appeals for the Ninth Circuit. It was an appeal by four Somali individuals who had been convicted based on data obtained through bulk telephone data collection by the National Security Agency. The appeals court upheld their convictions, but also ruled that bulk telephone data collection by the National Security Agency, the details of which were leaked by Edward Snowden, was illegal.

The case proceeded slowly because of classified data, taking seven years. On September 2, 2020, a unanimous decision by the three-judge panel was published. They ruled that bulk collection of telephone data was illegal because it violated the Foreign Intelligence Surveillance Act. They also ruled that it was possibly unconstitutional under the 4th Amendment.

This decision may not have had a major effect, because the bulk telephone data collection program involved in the case ended in 2015, and the program that replaced it was also shut down.

== Elsewhere ==
=== Germany ===
February 2014 the International League for Human Rights and the Chaos Computer Club filed a criminal complaint with the Federal Prosecutor General of the Federal Court of Justice of Germany. The complaint accuses "US, British and German secret agents, their supervisors, the German Minister of the Interior as well as the German Chancellor of illegal and prohibited covert intelligence activities, of aiding and abetting of those activities, of violation of the right to privacy and obstruction of justice in office by bearing and cooperating with the electronic surveillance of German citizens by NSA and GCHQ."
