= Mark Klein =

American whistleblower (1945–2025)

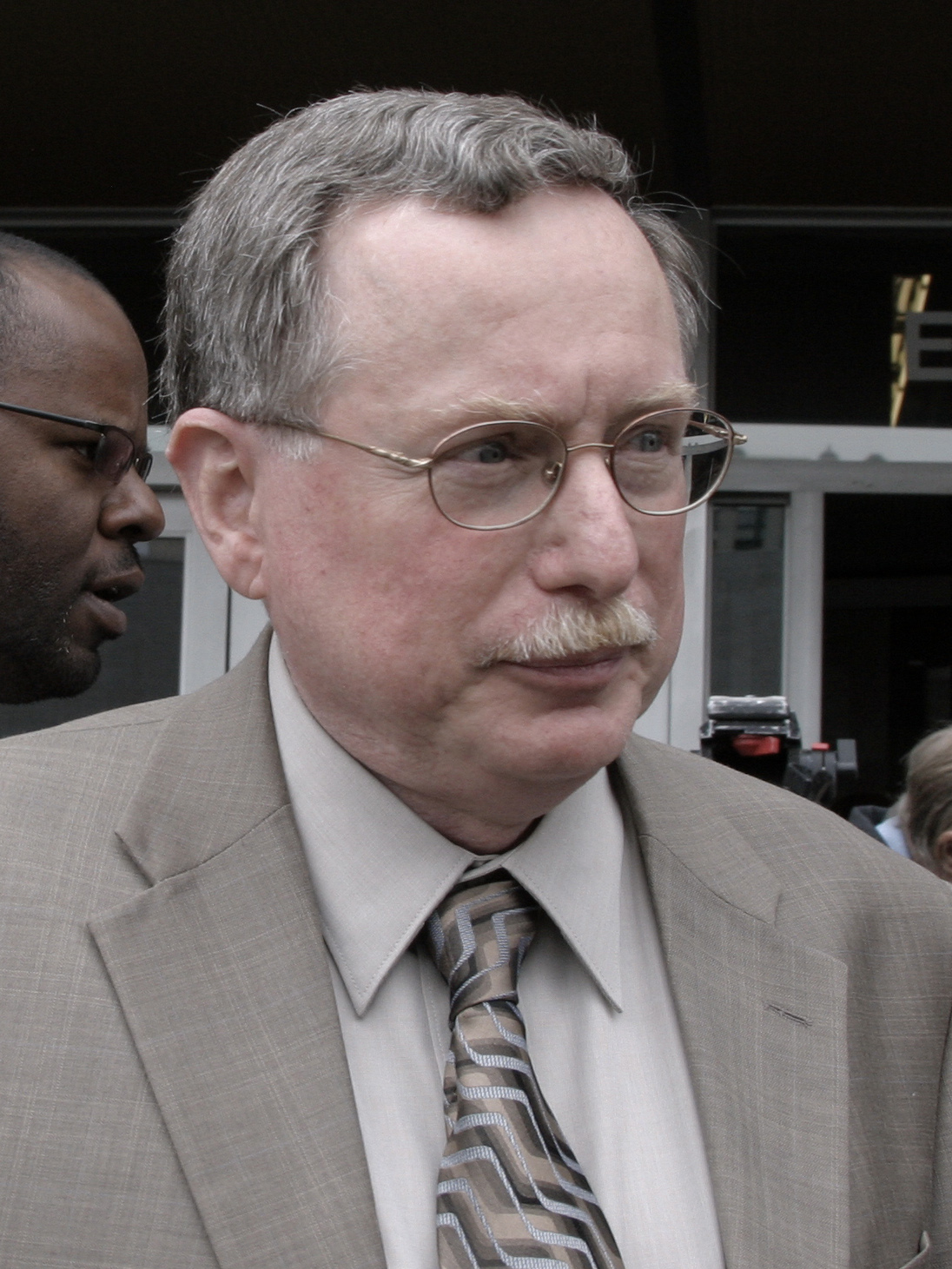
- Klein in 2006
- Born: May 2, 1945; New York City, U.S.
- Died: March 8, 2025 (aged 79); Oakland, California, U.S.
- Known for: Revelations regarding AT&T and the NSA domestic surveillance program Room 641A
- Awards: EFF Pioneer Award
- Scientific career
- Fields: Telecommunications
- Workplaces: AT&T

Mark Lee Klein (May 2, 1945 – March 8, 2025) was an American AT&T technician and whistleblower who revealed details of the company's cooperation with the United States National Security Agency in installing network hardware at a site known as Room 641A to monitor, capture and process American telecommunications. The subsequent media coverage became a major story in May 2006.

== Early life and education ==
Klein was born the younger of two children in Brooklyn on May 2, 1945. His mother was a school teacher and his father was a pharmaceutical executive. Klein graduated from Cornell University with a bachelor's degree in history in 1966. He later attended technical school and worked in computer manufacturing before working at AT&T.

== Career ==
For over 22 years Mark Klein worked for AT&T. Starting with the company as a Communications Technician in New York, where he remained from November 1981 until March 1991, he later continued in that capacity in California until 1998. From January 1998 to October 2003, Klein worked as a Computer Network Associate in San Francisco. Starting in October 2003, he returned to the role of Communications Technician, after which he retired in May 2004.

== Whistleblowing ==
In early 2006, Klein revealed details about AT&T's secretive cooperation with the National Security Agency (NSA) mass surveillance program. He found that the NSA was using a splitter to intercept and monitor all internet and other data traffic, which was then directed to a secure room at AT&T's facility, called Room 641A. He came across blueprints and documents outlining the technology, the program's existence, and AT&T's involvement with the NSA. He also found evidence that the program was active in other cities across the United States. This surveillance initiative followed the Patriot Act, which granted American defense and intelligence agencies broader powers after the 9/11 attacks. The Electronic Frontier Foundation (EFF) filed a lawsuit shortly afterwards.

In 2009, Klein wrote a book titled Wiring Up The Big Brother Machine...And Fighting It, in which he wrote about his experience discovering the relationship and his efforts to tell the public.

== Personal life and death ==
Klein was predeceased by his wife, Linda Thurston. Klein died from pancreatic cancer in Oakland on March 8, 2025, at the age of 79.

== Awards ==
In recognition of his actions, the EFF picked Klein as one of the winners of its 2008 Pioneer Awards.

== See also ==
- Edward Snowden
