= Taipale =

Taipale may refer to:

- Taipale (surname), a common family name in Finland
- Taipale, former name of Solovyovo, a rural locality in Leningrad Oblast, Russia
- The Battle of Taipale, fought between Soviet and Finnish forces during the Winter War
