= Corrine Brown =

American politician and convicted felon (born 1946)

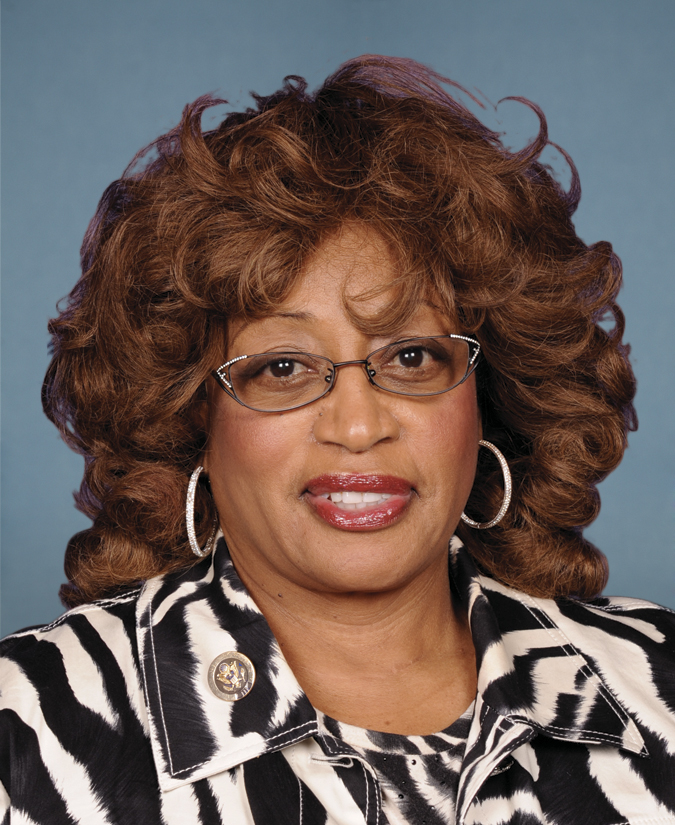

Ranking Member of the House Veterans' Affairs Committee
- In office January 3, 2015 – July 8, 2016
- Preceded by: Mike Michaud
- Succeeded by: Mark Takano (acting)

Member of the U.S. House of Representatives from Florida
- In office January 3, 1993 – January 3, 2017
- Preceded by: Redistricted
- Succeeded by: Al Lawson
- Constituency: 3rd district (1993–2013); 5th district (2013–2017)

Member of the Florida House of Representatives from the 17th district
- In office November 8, 1982 – November 3, 1992
- Preceded by: Redistricted
- Succeeded by: Redistricted

Personal details
- Born: November 11, 1946 (age 80) Jacksonville, Florida, U.S.
- Party: Democratic
- Children: 1 daughter
- Education: Florida A&M University (BS, MA); University of Florida (EdS)

Corrine Brown (born November 11, 1946) is an American former politician who served as a member of the U.S. House of Representatives from Florida from 1993 to 2017. She is a member of the Democratic Party. After a court-ordered redistricting significantly changed her district and a federal felony conviction for corruption, Brown was defeated in the 2016 Democratic primary by Al Lawson, who went on to win Brown's former seat.

On December 4, 2017, she was sentenced to five years in prison and ordered to pay restitution for fraud. Her conviction was later overturned on appeal and the court ordered she be retried on the charges. On May 17, 2022, she pleaded guilty on the charges to avoid a second trial. Former Congresswoman Brown was sentenced to the time that she had already served in the custody of the Federal Bureau of Prisons, specifically two years, eight months, and nine days. Brown was also ordered to pay $62,650.99 in restitution to the Internal Revenue Service.

== Early life, education, and academic career ==
Born in Jacksonville, Florida, Brown earned a bachelor of science degree from Florida A&M University in 1969 She earned a master's degree in 1971 from Florida A&M University, and in 1974 received an educational specialist degree from the University of Florida.

== Florida legislature ==
After an unsuccessful bid for the Florida House of Representatives in 1980, Brown was elected two years later from a newly drawn House district and served in the House for ten years.

== U.S. House of Representatives ==
=== Elections ===
==== 1992–2008 ====
After the 1990 census, the Florida legislature carved out a new 3rd congressional district in the northern part of the state. This district was designed to enclose an African-American majority within its boundaries. A horseshoe-shaped district encompassing largely African-American neighborhoods in Jacksonville, Gainesville, Orlando, Ocala, and Lake City, the 3rd district seemed likely to send Florida's first African-American to Congress since Reconstruction, and Brown decided to run.

Brown faced several candidates in the 1992 Democratic primary, but the strongest opponent to emerge was Andy Johnson, a white talk radio host from Jacksonville. Brown defeated Johnson in the primary and in a two-candidate runoff, and went on to win the general election in November 1992.

In 1995, the 3rd district was struck down by the United States Supreme Court as an unconstitutional racial gerrymander. One of the main instigators of the lawsuit that led to the redistricting was Brown's 1992 opponent, Andy Johnson. Brown railed against the change, complaining that "[t]he Bubba I beat couldn't win at the ballot box [so] he took it to court," in an interview with New Republic. Although the district was redrawn to be more compact and its black population decreased, Brown won reelection in 1996.

==== 2010 ====
On June 1, 2009, Brown announced she would form an exploratory committee for a possible run for the Democratic nomination for the U.S. Senate seat being vacated by Republican Mel Martinez saying, "These are challenging times for Florida. Our economy is in a shambles and our families are hurting. Charlie Crist may be good at taking pictures and making promises, but what has he actually accomplished?" In October 2009, it was announced that Brown would not run for Senate, and would seek reelection in the House of Representatives.

==== 2012–2016 ====
After decennial redistricting in 2012, Brown's district was renumbered as the 5th district, but its basic shape remained the same, stretching from Jacksonville to Orlando. It was identified as one of the most gerrymandered districts in the country. The League of Women Voters of Florida and the Florida Democratic Party challenged the new redistricting plan in court, claiming that the new 5th district was drawn to favor its incumbent and the Republican Party by packing Democratic voters, in violation of the newly adopted Fair Districts Amendment.

In 2015, the Florida Supreme Court ruled that the congressional redistricting plan was a partisan gerrymander in violation of the Fair Districts Amendment, and ordered the 5th district to be substantially redrawn. Brown challenged the new court-ordered map in federal court, arguing that the new plan violated the federal Voting Rights Act. In April 2016, the court ruled against Brown. The configuration approved by the Supreme Court made the new 5th district significantly more compact than its predecessor. It changed to an east-west direction along the Georgia border from downtown Jacksonville to Tallahassee.

Brown ran for reelection in 2016, even though she now found herself in a district that was over 62 percent new to her. After being indicted by a federal grand jury and facing trial on 22 federal felony criminal counts, Brown was defeated in the Democratic primary by former state senator Al Lawson of Tallahassee, who went on to win in November.

==== 2022 ====
In June 2022, Brown announced she would seek the Democratic nomination for a House seat given up by Val Demings, who had chosen to run for the Senate. She finished a distant fourth in a field that included, among others, the winner Maxwell Frost, Florida Senator Randolph Bracy, and former U.S. Representative Alan Grayson.

=== Tenure ===
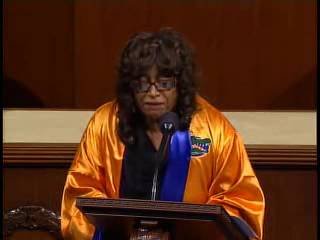
Brown delivering her infamous Go Gata speech at the U.S. House, 2009

In 2006, she voted "no" on the Child Custody Protection Act, Public Expression of Religion Act, Electronic Surveillance Modernization Act, Military Commissions Act, and Private Property Rights Implementation Act of 2006. She voted "yes" on the SAFE Port Act. On September 29, 2008, Brown voted for the Emergency Economic Stabilization Act of 2008.

==== Interest group ratings ====
In terms of interest group ratings, Brown held high percentages in pro-choice groups such as the Florida Alliance of Planned Parenthood Affiliates – Positions on Reproductive Rights (for which she has a 100% rating), NARAL Pro-Choice America – Positions (100%), National Family Planning & Reproductive Health Association – House of Representatives Score (100%). Brown overall held high percentage rates from other issue groups involving animal and wildlife issues, senior and security issues, labor, education, and welfare and poverty. Meanwhile, Brown's ratings were lower in issues that deal with agriculture and economics such as National Taxpayers Union – Positions on Tax and Spending (5%), American Farm Bureau Federation – Positions (33%), and United States Chamber of Commerce – Positions (13%). Other relatively low rates for Brown from interest groups include trade, conservative issues, national security, indigenous peoples issues, gun issues, immigration, and foreign aid and policy issues. The ratings do not necessarily correlate with Brown's positions or votes on certain issues during her time as a representative in the House.

=== Political controversies ===
National Baptist Convention check
In 1998, Brown was questioned by the House Ethics Committee about receiving a $10,000 check from National Baptist Convention leader and long-time associate, Henry Lyons. Brown confirmed receiving the check and denied she had used the money improperly. Brown said that she had taken the check and converted it into another check made out to Pameron Bus Tours to pay for transportation to a rally she organized in Tallahassee. She said that she didn't have to report the money, and that she had been cleared, explaining the rally was to protest the reorganization of her district lines, and she did not use it for herself.

==== Forgery ====
The Federal Election Commission admonished Brown and Brown's former campaign treasurer quit after he discovered that his name had been forged on her campaign reports. The staffer alleged to have forged the treasurer's signature stayed with Brown and as of 1998 was her chief of staff.

==== Congressional Accountability Project ====
On June 9, 1998, the advocacy group Congressional Accountability Project voted to conduct a formal inquiry regarding Brown. The Project called for the U.S. House Committee on Standards of Official Conduct to determine whether Brown had violated House ethics rules. One of the complaints was that Brown's adult daughter, Shantrel Brown, had received a luxury automobile as a gift from an agent of a Malian swindler and millionaire named Foutanga Babani Sissoko. Sissoko, a friend of Congresswoman Brown, had been imprisoned in Miami after pleading guilty to charges of bribing a customs officer. Brown had worked to secure his release, pressuring U.S. Attorney General Janet Reno to deport Sissoko back to his homeland as an alternative to continued incarceration. The Project held this violated the House gift rule, but Brown denied she had acted improperly. The congressional subcommittee investigating Brown found insufficient evidence to issue a Statement of Alleged Violation, but said she had acted with poor judgment in connection with Sissoko.

==== 2000 presidential election ====
Brown and other members of the House of Representatives objected to counting the 25 electoral votes from Florida which George W. Bush narrowly won after a contentious recount. Because no senator joined her objection, the objection was dismissed by Vice President Al Gore, who was Bush's opponent in the 2000 presidential election.

In July 2004, Brown was rebuked by the House of Representatives after she referred to the disputed 2000 presidential election in Florida as a "coup d'état". This comment came during floor debate over HR 4818, which would have provided for international monitoring of the 2004 U.S. presidential election.

==== 2004 presidential election ====
Brown was one of the 31 representatives who voted against counting the electoral votes from Ohio in the 2004 United States presidential election. President George W. Bush won Ohio by 118,457 votes. Without Ohio's electoral votes, the election would have been decided by the U.S. House of Representatives, with each state having one vote in accordance with the Twelfth Amendment to the United States Constitution.

=== Campaign finances ===
During her 2009–2010 campaign, Brown raised up to $966,669 from fundraising. Brown's top contributors included CSX Corporation, a railroad-based freight transportation company with its headquarters in Jacksonville; Carnival Corporation, cruise line operator; Picerne Real Estate Group; Union Pacific Corp and Berkshire Hathaway, which owns BNSF Railway. Brown's top industry contributors included those railroads, lawyers/farm firms, real estate, transportation unions, and sea transportation. Top sectors in Brown's 2009–2010 campaign included transportation, lawyers and lobbyists, labor, construction, and finance/insurance/real estate. During her campaign, the largest source of funds was given by large individual companies, which accounted for 54% of the contributions, and PAC contributions, which accounted for 36%. Sources of funds also included small individual contributions, self-financing on Brown's part and other sources.

== Felony fraud conviction ==
In July 2016, Brown and her chief of staff, Elias "Ronnie" Simmons, pleaded not guilty to a 22 count federal indictment in relation to a non-profit charity, One Door for Education Foundation. The indictment included charges of participating in a conspiracy to commit mail and wire fraud, multiple counts of mail and wire fraud, concealing material facts on required financial disclosure forms, theft of government property, obstruction of the Internal Revenue Service laws, and filing false tax returns.

Federal prosecutors allege the charity was to give scholarships to underprivileged students, but instead acted as the personal slush fund for Brown and her associates. The indictment said that Brown and Simmons "filled the coffers of Brown and her associates" with One Door donations for their personal and professional benefit, totaling $800,000, much of which was deposited in cash to Brown's personal bank accounts.

On May 11, 2017, Brown was convicted on 18 of 22 corruption charges ranging from mail fraud to filing a false federal tax return. and on December 4, 2017, she was sentenced to five years in prison and ordered to pay restitution. She reported on January 29, 2018 to Coleman Federal Correctional Complex in Sumter County, Florida, near Wildwood, to begin her sentence. She appealed her conviction, and collected her Congressional pension until her appeal concluded. Subsequently, Brown lost her appeal on January 10, 2020.

=== Conviction overturned ===
On May 6, 2021, the en banc 11th Circuit Court of Appeals overturned Brown's conviction, ruling in a 7-4 decision that a juror had been improperly removed by the trial judge, Timothy J. Corrigan, because the juror had claimed the Holy Spirit had spoken to him. The court's opinion remanded the case back to the United States District Court for the Middle District of Florida for a new trial. The Justice Department could have appealed the Circuit Court's decision to the United States Supreme Court. In January 2022, a retrial was scheduled for September 2022.

Brown was released from prison on April 22, 2020 citing health concerns. Her attorney argued she was at increased risk of COVID-19 because of her age and underlying health conditions.

=== New guilty plea ===
On May 17, 2022, Brown chose to avoid a new trial by pleading guilty to the charge of "interference with the due administration of Internal Revenue Service laws."

== Committee assignments ==
- Committee on Transportation and Infrastructure
  - Subcommittee on Aviation
  - Subcommittee on Coast Guard and Maritime Transportation
  - Subcommittee on Railroads, Pipelines, and Hazardous Materials (Ranking Member)
  - Subcommittee on Water Resources and Environment
- Committee on Veterans' Affairs
  - Subcommittee on Health

== Electoral history ==
=== Florida House of Representatives (1980–1988) ===
Florida House of Representatives, District 20, 1980 primary:
- Carl Ogden (D) – 17,437 (57.7%)
- Corrine Brown (D) – 12,773 (42.3%)

Florida House of Representatives, District 17, 1982 primary:

- Corrine Brown (D) – 4,053 (37.5%)
- Eric O. Simpson (D) – 3,133 (29.0%)
- Jim Glenwright (D) – 1,994 (18.5%)
- Ervin L. Norman (D) – 1,627 (15.1%)

Florida House of Representatives, District 17, 1982 primary runoff:

- Corrine Brown (D) – 5,433 (59.9%)
- Eric O. Simpson (D) – 3,632 (40.1%)

Florida House of Representatives, District 17, 1984 primary:

- Corrine Brown (D) – 5,344 (80.6%)
- Anthony Gomes (D) – 1,287 (19.4%)

Florida House of Representatives, District 17, 1986 primary:

- Corrine Brown (D) – 7,053 (79.4%)
- Anthony Gomes (D) – 1,827 (20.6%)

Florida House of Representatives, District 17, 1988 primary:

- Corrine Brown (D) – 4,221 (73.2%)
- Denise Diamond Parsons (D) – 1,544 (26.8%)

=== U.S. Congress (1992–2016) ===
Florida's 3rd congressional district, 1992:

- Corrine Brown (D) – 91,918 (59.3%)
- Don Weidner (R) – 63,115 (40.7%)

Florida's 3rd congressional district, 1994:

- Corrine Brown (D) – 63,855 (57.7%)
- Marc Little (R) – 46,907 (42.3%)

Florida's 3rd congressional district, 1996:

- Corrine Brown (D) – 98,051 (61.2%)
- Preston James Fields (R) – 62,173 (38.3%)

Florida's 3rd congressional district, 1998:

- Corrine Brown (D) – 66,621 (55.4%)
- Bill Randall (R) – 53,530 (44.6%)

Florida's 3rd congressional district, 2000:

- Corrine Brown (D) – 102,143 (57.6%)
- Jennifer Carroll (R) – 75,228 (42.4%)
- Carl Sumner (WRI) – 1 (0.0%)

Florida's 3rd congressional district, 2002:

- Corrine Brown (D) – 88,462 (59.3%)
- Jennifer Carroll (R) – 60,747 (40.7%)
- Jon Arnett (WRI) – 4 (0.0%)

Florida's 3rd congressional district, 2004:

- Corrine Brown (D) – 172,833 (99.2%)
- Johnny M. Brown (WRI) – 1,323 (0.8%)

Florida's 3rd congressional district, 2006:

- Corrine Brown (D) – Unopposed (100%)

Florida's 3rd congressional district, 2008:

- Corrine Brown (D) – Unopposed (100%)

Florida's 3rd congressional district, 2010:

- Corrine Brown (D) – 94,744 (63.0%)
- Mike Yost (R) – 50,932 (33.9%)
- Terry Martin-Back (NPA) – 4,625 (3.1%)

Florida's 5th congressional district, 2012:

- Corrine Brown (D) – 190,472 (70.8%)
- LeAnne Kolb (R) – 70,700 (26.3%)
- Eileen Fleming (NPA) – 7,978 (3.0%)
- Bruce Ray Riggs (WRI) – 3 (0.0%)

Florida's 5th congressional district, 2014:

- Corrine Brown (D) – 112,340 (65.5%)
- Glo Smith (R) – 59,237 (34.5%)

Florida's 5th congressional district, 2016 primary:

- Al Lawson (D) - 39,261 (48%)
- Corrine Brown (D) - 32,157 (39%)
- LaShonda Holloway (D) - 11,004 (13%)

== Awards ==
- Trumpet Award

== See also ==
- List of American federal politicians convicted of crimes
- List of federal political scandals in the United States
- List of African-American United States representatives
- Women in the United States House of Representatives

U.S. House of Representatives
Preceded by Charles Bennett	Member of the U.S. House of Representatives from Florida's 3rd congressional district 1993–2013	Succeeded by Ted Yoho
Preceded by Rich Nugent	Member of the U.S. House of Representatives from Florida's 5th congressional district 2013–2017	Succeeded by Al Lawson
Preceded by Mike Michaud	Ranking Member of the House Veterans' Affairs Committee; 2015–2016	Succeeded by Mark Takano; Acting
U.S. order of precedence (ceremonial)
Preceded by Cliff Stearns as Former U.S. Representative	Order of precedence of the United States as Former U.S. Representative	Succeeded by Sam Farr as Former U.S. Representative
