= RISA =

RISA may refer to:

- Recording Industry of South Africa
- Reforming Intelligence and Securing America Act of 2024
