= Center for Constitutional Rights v. Bush =

2006 warrantless wiretapping lawsuit

CCR v. Bush
- Court: United States District Court for the Southern District of New York, Second Circuit Court of Appeals
- Full case name: Center for Constitutional Rights v. George W. Bush, et al.

Case history
- Appealed from: United States District Court for the Southern District of New York
- Appealed to: Second Circuit Court of Appeals

Keywords
- NSA surveillance; Warrantless wiretapping; First Amendment; Fourth Amendment; Executive power; Center for Constitutional Rights; Alberto Gonzales

CCR v. Bush is a legal action by the Center for Constitutional Rights against the George W. Bush administration, challenging the National Security Agency's (NSA's) surveillance of people within the United States, including the interception of CCR emails without first securing a warrant. The lawsuit was filed on January 17, 2006. The center's lawyers argued that the warrantless wiretap program was: "... illegal because it lacks judicial approval or statutory authorization,"

The center's description of the suit stated:

Given that the government has accused many of CCR's overseas clients of being associated with Al Qaeda or of interest to the 9/11 investigation, there is little question that these attorneys have been subject to the NSA Surveillance Program. This lawsuit aims to protect CCR attorneys' right to represent their clients free of unlawful and unchecked surveillance.

The Center filed for summary judgment on March 9, 2006. The Center quoted a letter to the United States Senate from then-Attorney-General Alberto Gonzales:

Although the program does not specifically target the communications of attorneys or physicians, calls involving such persons would not be categorically excluded from interception.

On December 11, 2015, the center announced that the Appeals Court stands by decision to allow lawsuit against high-level Bush officials for Post-9/11 abuses. The Second Circuit panel roundly rejected the government's national security justification for racial profiling, writing:

[W]e simply cannot conclude at this stage that concern for the safety of our nation justified the violation of the constitutional rights on which this nation was built. The question at this stage of the litigation is whether the MDC Plaintiffs have plausibly pleaded that the Defendants exceeded the bounds of the Constitution in the wake of 9/11. We believe that they have.
