= Electronic Privacy Information Center v. Department of Justice =

- Court: United States District Court for the District of Columbia
- Decided: Mar. 31, 2014

Court membership
- Judges sitting: Henry Kennedy (retired mid-case); Royce C. Lamberth

Case opinions
- Royce C. Lamberth, U.S. District Judge

Keywords
- wiretapping, surveillance, NSA, George W. Bush, privacy

EPIC v. Department of Justice is a 2014 case in the United States District Court for the District of Columbia between the Electronic Privacy Information Center (EPIC) and the U.S. Department of Justice (DOJ) where EPIC seeks court action to enforce their Freedom of Information Act request for documents that the Department of Justice has withheld pertaining to George W. Bush's authorization of NSA warrantless surveillance.

== Background ==
On December 16, 2005, the New York Times published an article revealing that President Bush authorized the National Security Agency to "eavesdrop on Americans and others inside the US to search for evidence of terrorist activity without the court-approved warrants ordinarily required for domestic spying." Foreshadowing the secrecy at issue in this case, the White House asked the New York Times to not publish the article as it could "[jeopardize] continuing investigations and alert would-be terrorists that they might be under scrutiny." The New York Times agreed to delay publication for a year in order to conduct additional reporting, which resulted in the omission of information that "administration officials argued could be useful to terrorists" from the final article.

Just four hours after the publication of this article, EPIC submitted a FOIA request to the Department of Justice for the legal justification behind the "Warrantless Wiretapping" program of President Bush.

== EPIC's FOIA Request ==
On October 3, 2013, by way of the Freedom of Information Act (FOIA), EPIC requested copies of the following documents:

1. An audit of NSA domestic surveillance activities
2. Guidance or a "checklist" to help decide whether probable cause exists to monitor an individual's communications
3. Communications conceding the use of information obtained through NSA domestic surveillance as the basis for the DOJ surveillance applications to the FISC
4. Legal memoranda, opinions, or statements concerning increased domestic surveillance, including "one authored by John C. Yoo shortly after September 11, 2001 discussing the potential for warrantless use of enhanced electronic surveillance techniques"

EPIC also requested a fee waiver as well as an expedited process because, they argued, it is urgent to inform the public "about an actual or alleged federal government activity" that concerns all Americans and is potentially illegal.

Fourteen days following the initial filing of the FOIA request, the Department of Justice approved EPIC's fee waiver and expedited processing requests.

== EPIC v. DOJ (D.C. 2014) ==
Despite receiving approval notices from all of the agencies, the DOJ did not follow-up or send any materials to EPIC. In January 2006, EPIC responded to the DOJ's inaction by filing a suit.

== EPIC's Complaints ==
EPIC's lawsuit made the following claims:

1. The DOJ is not complying with the deadline set by the FOIA statute.
2. The DOJ is denying EPIC and the public their lawfully entitled access to these records, an entitlement codified in the FOIA statute.

EPIC asked for the court to require the Department of Justice to immediately process the request, disclose all of the requested records, and award the EPIC its cost and attorneys' fees, as well as any other relief the Court deems just and proper.

Simultaneously, EPIC requested a preliminary injunction that would require the Department of Justice to immediately process the request and disclose all of the requested records.

== DOJ's Response ==
At the same time, the DOJ requested a summary judgment to dismiss the case. The DOJ argued that it legally withheld the requested documents under the first and third FOIA exemptions. The first exemption of the FOIA concerns national defense and foreign policy, exempting material that is "specifically authorized under criteria established by an Executive order to be kept secret in the interest of national defense or foreign policy." The third exemption of FOIA concerns material that has been "specifically exempted from disclosure by statute"; these statutes are commonly referred to as FOIA Exemption 3 Statutes.

== Judge's Decision ==
After conducting an "in camera review," where the judge reviews the documents privately without their incorporation into the legal record, the judge determined that the documents in question did in fact qualify for exemption under the first and third exemptions (national defense and statute-based exemption, respectively).

In his analysis, the judge cited a former case in which the Electronic Frontier Foundation sued the Department of Justice over its failure to respond to EFF's FOIA request concerning the US government's engagement in telephone surveillance. The EFF v. DOJ court cited Exemption Five as an acceptable justification for the DOJ's withholding of the documents on the grounds of Exemption 5. Exemption Five exempts documents that include "confidential, pre-decisional legal advice" that are protected as part of the "deliberative-process and attorney-client communications privileges." Finding no reason to distinguish the EFF case from the case at issue, the judge applied the EFF case analysis and held that some of the documents requested by EPIC qualified for withholding under Exemption Five.

As a result, given that no un-exempted documents remained to be disclosed, the court granted DOJ's motion for summary judgment and dismissed the case with prejudice. In other words, EPIC was not granted copies of the documents for which they had submitted a Freedom of Information Act request.

== EPIC Acquires Documents ==
Eight years after the initial FOIA request, through an ACLU lawsuit (which EPIC joined as plaintiff) concerning a similar FOIA request, EPIC obtained a mostly unredacted version of two key memos written by former Justice Department official Jack Goldsmith. The Stellar Wind program is described in the memos as containing four components, all of which are types of information the NSA has been authorized to collect without a court order: telephone content (i.e., warrantless wiretapping), Internet content, telephone metadata (i.e., the massive call records database), and Internet metadata. Providing legal justification for the Stellar Wind program, Goldsmith's memos argue that the president has "inherent constitutional power to monitor Americans' communications without a warrant."

While the memos are at times cited as justifying surveillance specifically in times of war, Goldsmith's memos cite the Federalist Papers to argue that "the president can conduct warrantless searches for foreign intelligence 'even in peacetime.' "

Many argue that these legal justifications are retroactive and anti-democratic, in that the argument, as it stands, insulates the Executive Branch's surveillance efforts from Congressional disapproval.

The portions redacted are believed to include dissenting arguments, as well as the arguments that explicitly lay out justifications for undermining the American peoples' civil liberties.

== See also ==
- Hepting v. AT&T
- NSA call database
- Surveillance
- Wiretapping
