= Taipale (surname) =

Taipale is a common Finnish surname. As of December 2012, almost 4,000 people in Finland have this name, which makes it approximately one in 1,400. The meaning is portage, journey or stretch of road.

== Notable people ==
Notable people having this surname include:

- Armas Taipale, Finnish athlete
- Hannu Taipale, Finnish cross country skier
- Ilkka Taipale, Finnish politician and psychiatrist
- Ilmari Taipale, Finnish long-distance runner
- K. A. Taipale, Finnish lawyer, scholar, and social theorist
- Kuisma Taipale, Finnish cross-country skier
- Reijo Taipale, Finnish pop singer
- Tero Taipale, Finnish football player
- Vappu Taipale, Finnish politician and psychiatrist
