= National Security Surveillance Act =

American congressional bill

National Security Surveillance Act of 2006
- Long title: A bill to establish procedures for the review of electronic surveillance programs.
- Acronyms (colloquial): NSSA
- Enacted by: the 109th United States Congress

Legislative history
- Introduced in the Senate as S. 2453 by Arlen Specter (R-PA) on March 15, 2006; Committee consideration by Senate Judiciary Committee

The National Security Surveillance Act (S. 2453) was a bill in the United States Congress that would have established procedures for the review of electronic surveillance programs. It was similar to the Military Commissions Act of 2006.

== Summary ==
The bill:

- Redefine surveillance so that only programs that catch the substance of a communication need oversight. Any government surveillance that captures, analyzes and stores patterns of communications such as phone records, or e-mail and website addresses, is no longer considered surveillance.
- Expands the section of law that allows the attorney general to authorize spying on foreign embassies, so long as there's no "substantial likelihood" that an American's communication would be captured.
- Repeals the provision of federal law that allows the government unfettered wiretapping and physical searches without warrants or notification for 15 days after a declaration of war. The lack of any congressional restraint on the president's wartime powers arguably puts the president at the height, rather than the ebb, of his powers in any time of war, even an undeclared one.
- Repeals the provision of federal law that limits the government's wartime powers to conduct warrantless wiretapping and physical searches to a period of 15 days after a declaration of war.
- Repeals the provision of federal law that puts a time limit on the government's wartime powers to conduct warrantless wiretapping and physical searches against Americans. Under current law, the president has that power for only 15 days following a declaration of war.
- Allows the attorney general, or their designates, to authorize widespread domestic spying, such as monitoring all instant-messaging systems in the country, so long as the government promises to delete anything not terrorism-related.
- Moves all court challenges to the NSA surveillance program to a secretive court in Washington, D.C., composed of judges appointed by the Chief Justice of the Supreme Court. Only government lawyers would be allowed in the courtroom.
- Allows the government to get warrants for surveillance programs as a whole, instead of having to describe to a judge the particular persons to be monitored and the methods to be used.

== See also ==
- Foreign Intelligence Surveillance Act
- Church Committee
- NSA warrantless surveillance controversy
