= Chip Pitts =

American professor and lecturer (born 1960)

- Born: November 24, 1960 (age 65)
- Known for: Human Rights/Civil Liberties
- Board member of: Electronic Privacy Information Center; The Negotiation Center (UTD); ACLU Dallas

Chip Pitts (born November 24, 1960) is an American lecturer who has regularly taught at Stanford, Oxford, and as a Professor or Visiting Professor at other major universities in the West and Asia. Considered one of the world’s “top academics on corporate responsibility,” his teaching includes leadership, global governance, business and human rights, sustainability, and ethical globalization. Advisor to the UN Global Compact, he has led the Compact’s Good Practice Note project since its inception. Currently a board member of the Electronic Privacy Information Center, he has also been a board leader (among others) of Bonn-based Fairtrade International, former President and Chair of the Bill of Rights Defense Committee, and former Chair of Amnesty International USA.

== Career ==
Pitts is an international attorney, human rights activist, businessman, and law educator who brings practical as well as academic experience to bear in lecturing on human rights and international business at law schools and universities including Stanford and Oxford.

Former Chief Legal Officer of Nokia and partner at law firm Baker & McKenzie, Pitts has served as founding executive, entrepreneur, and investor in technology startups including Tellme Networks. Among awards Pitts has received are the Peacemaker of the Year award from the Dallas Peace Center, and the Dallas Bar Association's Pro Bono Volunteer of the Year award, in addition to other pro bono and outstanding service awards from various bar associations and other organizations. Recent pro bono litigation in which he has been involved includes EPIC’s successful lawsuit against the Department of Homeland Security and Transportation Security Administration against the “naked body scanners,” as well as the Kiobel litigation to preserve the Alien Tort Statute as a corporate accountability remedy.

He is a frequent keynote speaker at academic conferences, international conferences, world affairs councils, civil liberties conferences, and foreign policy committee meetings. For over two decades, he has represented the United States government as well as nongovernmental organizations such as Amnesty International, Human Rights First (fka Lawyers Committee for Human Rights), and the Advocates for Human Rights at the United Nations.

He was an advisor to the Business Leaders Initiative on Human Rights, and is a board or advisory board member of other organizations including The Negotiations Center, the London-Based Business and Human Rights Resource Centre, the Electronic Privacy Information Center, and the ACLU of Dallas.

He blogs at www.CSRLaw.org, and his writing has appeared in newspapers and magazines ranging from The Washington Post to the Wall Street Journal, from The Nation and The New Republic to Liberty magazine and The American Conservative, and from the Washington Spectator to Foreign Affairs. He has testified before foreign parliaments and the U.S. Congress, appears frequently in international media on topics including international law, privacy, national security, and human rights, and his broadcast commentaries have appeared among other places on National Public Radio and Public Radio International. Pitts is a member of the Council on Foreign Relations in New York and the Pacific Council on International Policy in San Francisco.

== Works ==
Pitts is the author, co-author, or editor of numerous articles and several books, including:

- Corporate Social Responsibility: A Legal Analysis (LexisNexis, 2009) ISBN 978-0-433-45115-0
- Human Rights Corporate Accountability Guide: From Law to Norms to Values (BLIHR & Harvard, 2008).
- Business, Human Rights, & The Environment: The Role of the Lawyer in CSR & Ethical Globalization 26:2 Berkeley J. Int'l Law 479 (2008).
- Baker & McKenzie NAFTA Handbook (CCH 1994).
