= Curtis Bradley =

American lawyer

- Citizenship: American
- Education: University of Colorado Boulder (BA); Harvard University (JD)
- Occupation: Legal scholar
- Employer: University of Chicago Law School

Curtis A. Bradley is an American lawyer and scholar of international law and constitutional law. He is currently the Allen M. Singer Distinguished Service Professor of Law at the University of Chicago Law School.

== Education ==
Bradley received his bachelor's degree from the University of Colorado Boulder in 1985 and his J.D. from Harvard Law School in 1988. He then clerked for Judge David M. Ebel of the United States Court of Appeals for the Tenth Circuit and for Justice Byron White of the Supreme Court of the United States. He practiced law as an associate at Covington & Burling from 1991 to 1995.

== Career ==
Bradley started his teaching career at the University of Colorado law school in 1995. He joined the University of Virginia School of Law in 1999, originally as a visiting professor. He served as a full professor there from 2000 to 2005, when he became a professor at Duke Law School. In 2004, he served as a legal advisor on international law in the United States Department of State. He left Duke to join the University of Chicago Law School faculty in 2021. He was the co-editor-in-chief of the American Journal of International Law from 2018 to 2022. He has also served as a Reporter for the American Law Institute's Restatement (Fourth) of the Foreign Relations Law of the United States. In addition to writing numerous law review articles, Bradley has published several books, including "International Law in the U.S. Legal System" and "Historical Gloss and Foreign Affairs: Constitutional Authority in Practice." He is also the co-author of textbooks on U.S. foreign relations law and federal court jurisdiction.
