= Electronic Surveillance Modernization Act =

The Electronic Surveillance Modernization Act (H.R. 5825 of the 109th Congress) was passed on September 28, 2006, by a vote 232 to 191. It has been referred to the United States Senate and the Senate Committee for the Judiciary for further debate. It died in the Senate.
