= 2025 Abu Dhabi Autonomous Racing League =

The 2025 season of the Abu Dhabi Autonomous Racing League began on 11 April 2025 in Abu Dhabi. This year marks the first multi-format season of the A2RL, racing both drones and self-driving cars. The venue of choice for the Car Race, set for 15 November 2025, is the Yas Marina Circuit, same as the previous year, while the Drone Race was held at the ADNEC Marina Hall.

== Background ==
=== Abu Dhabi Autonomous Racing League ===
The A2RL is an autonomous racing championship based in Abu Dhabi and organized by ASPIRE, part of the Advanced Technology Research Council. It is one of two active autonomous car racing championships, the second being the US-based Indy Autonomous Challenge. However, it was a shame fans were unable to follow the live stream on YouTube as promised. Unlike the IAC, which primarily focuses on time trials and simulated races, the A2RL's car races are closer to a standard grand prix formula race format. Both use Dallara-supplied racecars; the IAC uses the AV-24 chassis derived from Indy NXT's IL-15, while the A2RL chassis is designated EAV-24 and is derived from the SF-23 chassis used in Japanese Super Formula races.

=== Entrants ===
As of May 2025, the following teams have been confirmed to be part of the A2RL:

2025 A2RL Car Race Entry List
| Team name | 2024 time trial (qualifying) | 2024 result | Notes |
|---|---|---|---|
| (Germany) Technical University of Munich | P3 | P1 | 2024 Champion |
| (Italy) PoliMOVE | P1 | DNF | 2024 Pole-sitter |
| (Italy) UNIMORE Racing | P2 | DNF | 2024 Fastest Lap |
| (Germany) Constructor University | P4 | P2 | |
| (Hungary) HUMDA Lab | P5 | DNQ | |
| (United States) Code19 Racing | P6 | DNQ | |
| (China) (United Arab Emirates) Fly Eagle | P7 | DNQ | |
| (Singapore) (United Arab Emirates) Kinetiz | P8 | DNQ | Failed to set a qualifying time in 2024 |
| TGM Grand Prix/SEVRUS Japan | N/A | N/A | Rookie team |
| (France) FR4IAV/Aladin Innovation | N/A | N/A | Rookie team |
| (United Arab Emirates) TII Racing | N/A | N/A | Rookie team; partner team |

2025 A2RL Drone Race Entry List
| AI Team Name | DCL Team Name |
|---|---|
| Cyclone Lab | Cyclone Drone Racing |
| Starling | Raiden Racing |
| Code19 Racing | Spain Drone Team |
| FLYBY | |
| Fly Eagle | |
| KAIST | |
| MRS Fly for Future | |
| CVAR-UPM | |
| Kinetiz | |
| Code19 Racing | |
| MAVLAB | |

== Drone race ==
2025 Abu Dhabi Autonomous Racing League Grand Prix

Race details
- Date: 12 April 2025
- Official name: 2025 A2RL Autonomous drone race
- Location: ADNEC Marina Hall, Abu Dhabi, UAE

Podium
| First | (Netherlands) Unnamed AI | MAVLAB |
| Second | (United Arab Emirates) Unnamed AI | TII Racing |
| Third | (South Korea) Unnamed AI | KAIST |

=== Qualifying ===
Qualifying took place over an unspecified period of time ending in March 2025. 14 teams qualified.

=== Final podiums ===
Top 3 Classifications for the 2025 A2RL Drone Race
| Position | AI Grand Challenge | AI vs Human Challenge | Multi-drone race | Autonomous drag race |
|---|---|---|---|---|
| 1 | (Netherlands) MAVLAB | (Netherlands) MAVLAB | (United Arab Emirates) TII Racing | (Netherlands) MAVLAB |
| 2 | (United Arab Emirates) TII Racing | (Japan) Yuki Hashimoto (Raiden) | Not disclosed | Not disclosed |
| 3 | (South Korea) KAIST | (Spain) Platon Cheremnykh (SDT) | Not disclosed | (Czech Republic) MRS Fly for Future |

== Car race ==
2025 Abu Dhabi Autonomous Racing League Grand Prix

Race details
- Date: 15 November 2025
- Official name: 2025 A2RL Autonomous car race
- Location: Yas Marina circuit, Abu Dhabi, UAE
- Course: Permanent racing facility
- Course length: 3.005 km
- Distance: 20 laps, 20.1 km (12.48 miles)
- Scheduled distance: 20 laps (20.1 km) or 30 minutes

Pole position
| Driver | (Germany) Hailey | Technical University of Munich |
- Time: 12:34.621
- Grid positions set by results of sprint

Fastest lap
| Driver | (Germany) Hailey | Technical University of Munich |
- Time: 58.183 on lap 20

Podium
| First | (Germany) Hailey | Technical University of Munich |
| Second | (United Arab Emirates) Musa | TII Racing |
| Third | (Italy) Eva | PoliMOVE |

The main event was scheduled for 15 November 2025 at the Yas Marina Circuit.

=== Pre-season testing ===
Pre-season testing took place in early 2025. According to the organizers, over 300 terabytes of data were gathered and 1640 laps were logged between all teams.

=== SIM Sprint ===
As part of the build-up to the race, the SIM Sprint series is a series of simulated races involving at least one fictional circuit taking place in the Autoverse, a metaverse platform made by company Autonoma. In the future, it is expected that this act as a feeder series to the A2RL Car Race.

==== SIM Sprint standings ====
| Colour | Result |
|---|---|
| Gold | Winner |
| Silver | Second place |
| Bronze | Third place |
| Green | Points classification |
| Blue | Non-points classification |
| Blue | Non-classified finish (NC) |
| Purple | Retired, not classified (Ret) |
| Red | Did not qualify (DNQ) |
| Red | Did not pre-qualify (DNPQ) |
| Black | Disqualified (DSQ) |
| White | Did not start (DNS) |
| White | Withdrew (WD) |
| White | Race cancelled (C) |
| Blank | Did not practice (DNP) |
| Blank | Did not arrive (DNA) |
| Blank | Excluded (EX) |

SIM Sprint races
| Round | Circuit | Pole | Winner | Fastest lap |
|---|---|---|---|---|
| 1 | (United Arab Emirates) Yas Marina | Not disclosed | (Germany) Technical University of Munich | (Singapore) (United Arab Emirates) Kinetiz |
| 2 | (United Nations) Original circuit | Not disclosed | (Singapore) (United Arab Emirates) Kinetiz | Not disclosed |
| 3 | (Japan) Suzuka | Not disclosed | (Germany) Technical University of Munich | Not disclosed |
| 4 | (United Arab Emirates) Yas Marina | Not disclosed | (Singapore) (United Arab Emirates) Kinetiz | Not disclosed |

SIM Sprint points system
| Position | P1 | P2 | P3 | P4 | P5 | P6 |
|---|---|---|---|---|---|---|
| Points | 25 | 18 | 15 | 12 | 10 | 8 |

SIM Sprint points standings
| Pos. | Team | (United Arab Emirates) YAS1 | (United Nations) ORI | (Japan) SUZ | (United Arab Emirates) YAS2 | Points |
|---|---|---|---|---|---|---|
| 1 | (Singapore) (United Arab Emirates) Kinetiz | P5 ^{F} | P1 | P2 | P1 | 78 |
| 2 | (Germany) Technical University of Munich | P1 | P4 | P1 | P4 | 74 |
| 3 | (Italy) UNIMORE Racing | P4 | P3 | P3 | P3 | 57 |
| 4 | (Italy) PoliMOVE | | P2 | P4 | P2 | 48 |
| 5 | (United Arab Emirates) TII Racing | P3 | P5 | P5 | P6 | 43 |
| 6 | (Germany) Constructor University | P2 | P6 | | P5 | 36 |
| 7 | (Hungary) HUMDA Lab | P6 | | | | 8 |

=== Qualifying ===
Qualifying took place in October 2025. The top 6 in the 3-kilometer short-course time trials qualified for the main race.

==== Qualifying report ====
Once the qualifying cars were determined, there were a pair of sprint races to set the grid for the main event. One race was disputed by the top three qualifying teams and determined the pole-sitting car and the other two cars' starting positions, the other was disputed among the teams that scored P4 though P6 in the time trials and determined the remaining grid positions.

==== Qualifying results ====
Qualifying time trial results
| Position | Car name | Team | Session 1 | | Session 2 | | Session 3 | | Session 4 | |
| Position | Car name | Team | Lap time | Avg. Speed (kph) | Lap time | Avg. Speed (kph) | Lap time | Avg. Speed (kph) | Lap time | Avg. Speed (kph) |
|---|---|---|---|---|---|---|---|---|---|---|
| P1 | Gianna | (Italy) UNIMORE Racing | 2:04.836 | 86.7 | 1:14.691 | 144.8 | 1:07.590 | 160.1 | 1:01.855 | 174.9 |
| P2 | Musa | (United Arab Emirates) TII Racing | 1:36.477 | 112.1 | 1:09.699 | 155.2 | 1:14.182 | 145.8 | 1:03.642 | 170.0 |
| P3 | Hailey | (Germany) Technical University of Munich | 1:37.456 | 111.0 | 1:28.979 | 121.6 | 1:04.003 | 169.0 | 1:04.961 | 166.5 |
| P4 | Eva | (Italy) PoliMOVE | 1:39.774 | 108.4 | 1:14.199 | 146.0 | 1:20.016 | 135.2 | 1:04.119 | 168.7 |
| P5 | Sparkz | (Singapore) (United Arab Emirates) Kinetiz | 2:17.666 | 78.6 | 1:36.298 | 112.3 | 1:24.130 | 128.6 | 1:04.570 | 167.5 |
| P6 | Constructor AI | (Germany) Constructor University | 1:36.981 | 111.5 | 1:29.874 | 120.4 | 1:26.535 | 125.0 | 1:07.060 | 161.3 |
Qualifying cut-off: 1:07.060 (Constructor AI)
| P7 | Sakura | TGM Grand Prix/SEVRUS Japan | 2:08.068 | 84.5 | 1:24.495 | 128.0 | 1:19.790 | 135.6 | No time set | N/A |
| P8 | Juliette | (France) FR4IAV/Aladin Innovation | 1:33.272 | 116.0 | No time set | N/A | No time set | N/A | No time set | N/A |
| P9 | Maveric AI | (United States) Code19 Racing | 1:42.760 | 105.3 | 2:49.068 | 64.0 | 2:30.502 | 71.9 | No time set | N/A |
| P10 | R4PSON AI | (Hungary) HUMDA Lab/R4PSON | 2:00.289 | 89.9 | 10:58.310 | 16.4 | 3:47.659 | 47.5 | 8:14.011 | 21.9 |
| P11 | Feiying | (China) (United Arab Emirates) Fly Eagle | 4:31.493 | 39.8 | 2:28.267 | 72.8 | No time set | N/A | 8:12.848 | 21.9 |

Sprint race results
| Race | Grid Pos. | Car name | Team | Race Time | Difference |
|---|---|---|---|---|---|
| 1 | P1 | Hailey | (Germany) Technical University of Munich | 12:34.621 | N/A |
| 1 | P2 | Gianna | (Italy) UNIMORE Racing | 12:36.183 | +1.562 |
| 1 | P3 | Sparkz | (Singapore) (United Arab Emirates) Kinetiz | 12:56.106 | +1 lap |
| 2 | P4 | Musa | (United Arab Emirates) TII Racing | 13:23.859 | N/A |
| 2 | P5 | Eva | (Italy) PoliMOVE | 13:31.392 | +7.533 |
| 2 | P6 | Constructor AI | (Germany) Constructor University | 13:48.897 | +25.038 |

=== Main race ===
==== Race report ====
At about 20:30, a humanoid waved the green flag from the back of the grid, signalling the start of safety checks before the formation lap. It was a rolling start.

On Lap 1, just a few corners after crossing the line, Hailey (for team Technical University of Munich, or TUM) and Gianna (for team Unimore) quickly pushed out front, with what the commentators described as “aggressive” from Gianna.

On Lap 2 at Turn 6, Gianna dives up the inside of Hailey to take the lead. Hailey takes evasive action and slows down slightly.

At the end of Lap 6/start of Lap 7, both Gianna and Hailey lap slow-moving Constructor AI (for Constructor University), now 35 seconds behind Eva (team PoliMove). Gianna was slowed down by Constructor AI, causing Hailey to close the gap to Gianna.

On Lap 12, while trying to lap Constructor AI again and simultaneously defend from Hailey, Gianna rear-ended Constructor AI, causing Gianna to run into the barriers at Turn 1 and both cars to retire. This brought out a red flag, followed by a Full Course Yellow.

During the Full Course Yellow, on Lap 13, Turn 5, Sparkz (for team Kinetiz) span, presumably from cold tyre temperatures (a big concern after 2024's race), and dropping from second place down to fourth and last of the remaining cars.

On Lap 15, the green flag was shown, and the race was resumed.

On Lap 20, Hailey took the chequered flag and won the race for team TUM, as they did in 2024. Musa for TII Racing came second, over 47 seconds behind Hailey. Eva for PoliMove finished third.

==== Final race classification ====
| Final position | Time/Ret. | No. | Car name | Team | Starting grid | Notes |
|---|---|---|---|---|---|---|
| P1 | 20 laps | 33 | Hailey | (Germany) Technical University of Munich | P1 | Fastest Lap |
| P2 | +47.006 | 71 | Musa | (United Arab Emirates) TII Racing | P4 | |
| P3 | +55.037 | 5 | Eva | (Italy) PoliMove | P5 | |
| P4 | +1 lap | 3 | Sparkz | (Singapore) (United Arab Emirates) Kinetiz | P3 | |
| DNF | Lap 12 | 6 | Gianna | (Italy) Unimore | P2 | Retired (hit Constructor; then hit barrier) |
| DNF | Lap 10 | 8 | Constructor AI | (Germany) Constructor University | P6 | Retired (sudden stop; collision damage) |
