= 2026 Abu Dhabi Autonomous Racing League =

The 2026 season of the Abu Dhabi Autonomous Racing League began in early 2026 with the Autonomous Drone Race, and will end at an unknown date with the Autonomous Car Race at the Yas Marina Circuit.

== Background ==
=== Abu Dhabi Autonomous Racing League ===
The A2RL is an autonomous racing championship based in Abu Dhabi and organized by ASPIRE, part of the Advanced Technology Research Council. It is one of two active autonomous car racing championships, the second being the US-based Indy Autonomous Challenge. However, it was a shame fans were unable to follow the live stream on YouTube as promised. Unlike the IAC, which primarily focuses on time trials and simulated races, the A2RL's car races are closer to a standard grand prix formula race format. Both use Dallara-supplied racecars; the IAC uses the AV-24 chassis derived from Indy NXT's IL-15, while the A2RL chassis is designated EAV-24 and is derived from the SF-23 chassis used in Japanese Super Formula races.

=== Entrants ===
2026 A2RL Car Race Entry List
Team name	2025 sprint qualifying	2025 result	Notes
(Germany) Technical University of Munich	P1	P1	Two-time Champion
(Italy) PoliMOVE	P5	P3	2024 Pole-sitter
(Italy) UNIMORE Racing	P2	DNF	2024 Fastest Lap
(United Arab Emirates) TII Racing	P4	P2	Partner team
(Germany) Constructor University	P6	DNF	
(Singapore) (United Arab Emirates) Kinetiz	P3	P4	2025 SIM Sprint Champion
(Hungary) HUMDA Lab	DNQ	DNQ	
(United States) Code19 Racing	DNQ	DNQ	
(China) (United Arab Emirates) Fly Eagle	DNQ	DNQ	
TGM Grand Prix/SEVRUS Japan	DNQ	DNQ	
(United Arab Emirates) MBUZAI	N/A	N/A	Rookie team
(United Arab Emirates) DARC	N/A	N/A	Rookie team

== Drone race ==
=== Race report ===
The drone race occurred in April 2026 at the ADNEC Marina Hall.

==== Human VS AI Challenge ====
Quarterfinals
TII Racing	3
Alexandr Kholin	1
MAVLAB	3
Yuki Hashimoto	0
Kinetiz	3
Vincent Mayans	2
KAIST	0
Minchan Kim	3

Semifinals
TII Racing	4
MAVLAB	3
Kinetiz	0
Minchan Kim	4

Finals
TII Racing	4
Minchan Kim	4
Third Place
MAVLAB	5
Kinetiz	0

=== Final podiums ===
Position	AI vs Human Challenge	Multi-drone race	Autonomous drag race
1	(South Korea) Minchan Kim	(Netherlands) MAVLAB	(Netherlands) MAVLAB
2	(United Arab Emirates) TII Racing	(United Arab Emirates) TII Racing	(United Arab Emirates) TII Racing
3	(Netherlands) MAVLAB	(Singapore) Kinetiz	(Singapore) Kinetiz

== Car race ==
=== SIM Sprint ===
==== SIM Sprint standings ====
Current SIM sprint standings
Pos	Team	R1		R2		R3		R4		R5		Pts
Pos	Team	SR	FR	SR	FR	SR	FR	SR	FR	SR	FR	Pts
1	(Germany) TUM	P3	P3	P5	P2	P1	P2	P3	P3			98
2	(Singapore) (United Arab Emirates) Kinetiz	P1	P1	P2	P5	P3	P4	P2	P4			94
3	(Germany) Constructor University	P4	P5	P6	P3	P2	P1	P1	P5			90
4	(Italy) PoliMOVE	P6	P2	P3	P7	P4	P3	P6	P1			88
5	(Italy) UNIMORE Racing	P2	P4	P4	P6	P1	P6	P5	P2			77
6	(United Arab Emirates) TII Racing	P5	P6	P1	P1	WD	WD	WD	WD			51
7	(China) (United Arab Emirates) Fly Eagle	DNQ	DNQ	DNQ	P4	DNQ	P7	P4	P7			31
8	(United Arab Emirates) DARC	DNQ	P7	DNQ	DNQ	P5	P5	P7	P6			31
9	(United States) Code19 Racing	DNQ	DNQ	DNQ	DNQ	DNQ	DNQ	DNQ	P8			4
NC	(Hungary) HUMDA Lab	DNQ	DNQ	DNQ	DNQ	DNQ	DNQ	DNQ	DNQ			0
NC	(United Arab Emirates) MBUZAI	DNP	DNP	DNQ	DNQ	DNQ	DNQ	DNQ	DNQ			0
NC	TGM Grand Prix/SEVRUS Japan	DNP	DNP	DNQ	DNQ	DNQ	DNQ	DNQ	DNQ			0

=== ACI Racing Weekend ===
2026 A2RL ACI Racing Weekend Grand Prix

Race details
- Date: 5 September 2026
- Official name: 2026 A2RL x ACI Race
- Location: Autodromo Internazionale Enzo e Dino Ferrari, Imola, Italy
- Course: Permanent racing facility
- Course length: 4.909 km
- Distance: 12 laps, 58.908 km (36.6037 miles)

Pole position
Driver	(Italy) Gianna	UNIMORE Racing
- Time: 1:37.314
- Grid positions set by results of qualifying

Fastest lap
Driver	(Italy) Gianna	UNIMORE Racing
- Time: 1:40.085 on lap 8

Podium
First	(Singapore) Sparkz	Kinetiz
Second	(Germany) Constructor AI	Constructor University
Third	(Italy) Eva	PoliMOVE

==== Qualifying results ====
Qualifying results for the ACI-A2RL race
Position	Car name	Team	Best time	TIme difference
P1	Gianna	(Italy) UNIMORE Racing	1:37.314	Pole position
P2	Eva	(Italy) PoliMOVE	1:38.398	+1.084
P3	Hailey	(Germany) TUM	1:39.060	+1.647
P4	Sparkz	(Singapore) (United Arab Emirates) Kinetiz	1:40.250	+2.966
P5	Constructor AI	(Germany) Constructor University	1:41.278	+3.946

==== Race results ====
Finishing order for the A2RL-ACI Imola Race
Final position	No.	Car name	Team	Laps	Race time	Gap to winner	Notes
P1	3	Sparkz	(Singapore) (United Arab Emirates) Kinetiz	12	25:23.735		
P2	8	Constructor AI	(Germany) Constructor University	12	25:34.698	+10.963	
DNF	5	Eva	(Italy) PoliMOVE	9	15:38.225	+3 laps	Retired (rear-ended Gianna)
DNF	6	Gianna	(Italy) UNIMORE Racing	9	15:41.623	+3 laps	Retired (sudden stop; rear-ended); 5-second time penalty (stopping on track); Fastest Lap
DNS	33	Hailey	(Germany) TUM	0	No time	N/A	

=== Qualifying ===
==== Qualifying report ====
TBA

==== Qualifying results ====
TBA

=== Main race ===
==== Race report ====
TBA

==== Final race classification ====
TBA
