= Abu Dhabi Autonomous Racing League =

Autonomous racing competition held in the UAE

- Race to Innovate
- Category: Autonomous racing
- Country: United Arab Emirates
- Affiliations: ASPIRE (part of the Advanced Technology Research Council)
- Inaugural season: 2024
- Teams: 8 (2024); 11 (2025)
- Manufacturers: Car Race: Dallara (modified Super Formula chassis)
- Engine suppliers: Car Race: 4 Piston Racing K20C1 (based on Honda 2.0l)
- Tire suppliers: Yokohama Advan
- Teams' champion: Technical University of Munich
- Official website: a2rl.io

The Abu Dhabi Autonomous Racing League (A2RL) is an autonomous racing league based in Abu Dhabi and organized by ASPIRE, part of the UAE government's Advanced Technology Research Council. It has three distinct categories: the "car race", the drone race, and the buggy race. The first car race was held on 27 April 2024 at the Yas Marina Circuit, marking the first major autonomous formula race outside the US since the now-folded Roborace championship. The first drone race was held on 11 and 12 April 2025.

== Formats ==
A2RL has three distinct formats, the formula racing format (dubbed the Car Race), the quadcopter drone racing format (dubbed the Drone Race), and the off-road dune buggy racing format (dubbed the Buggy Race).

=== Car Race ===
A2RL Autonomous Car Race
- Yas Marina Circuit, Abu Dhabi, UAE
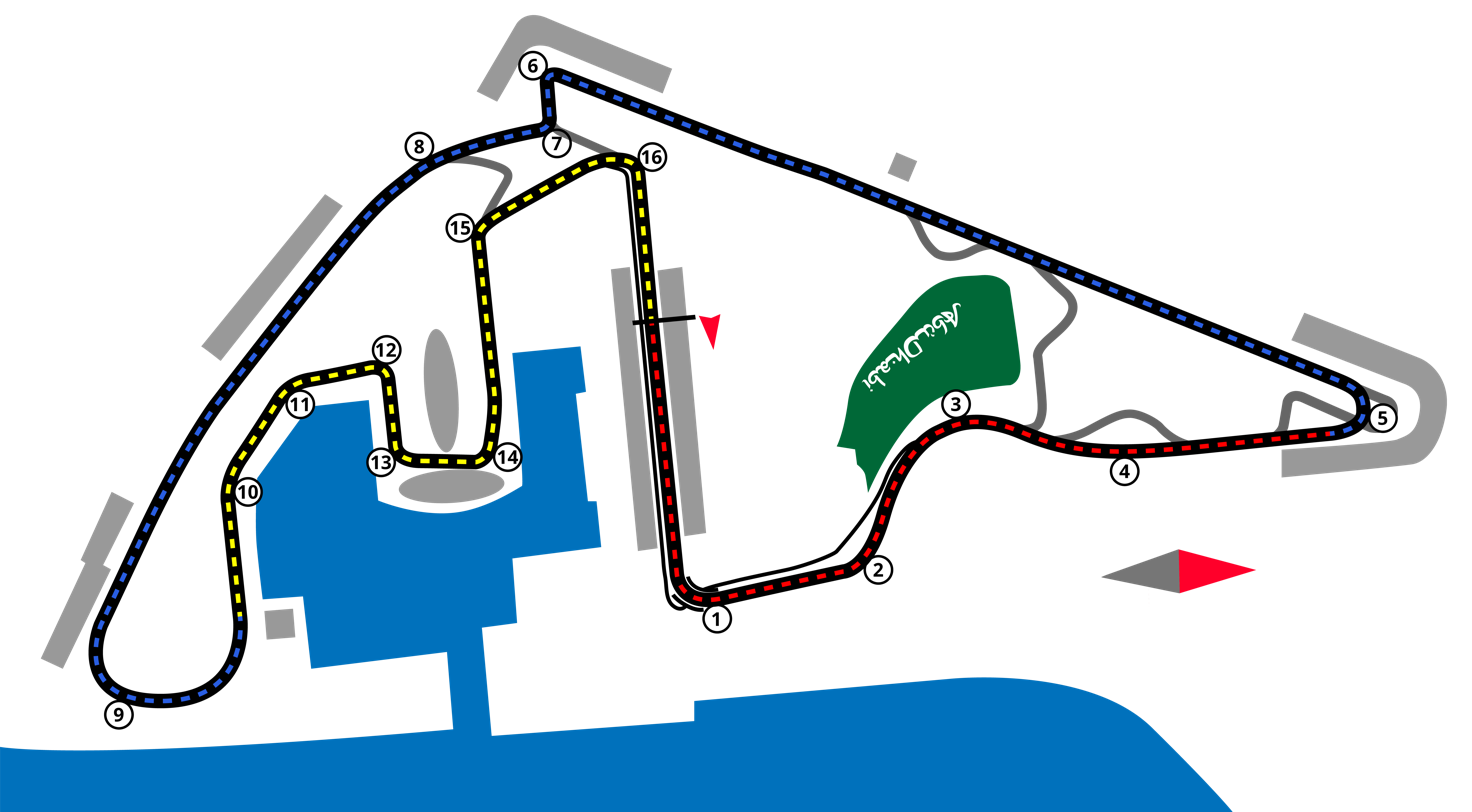

Race information
- Number of times held: 2
- First held: 2024
- Circuit length: 3.005 km
- Race length: 20.1 km
- Laps: 20 laps

Last race (2025)

Pole position
- (Germany) Hailey; Technical University of Munich; 12:34.621

Podium
- 1. (Germany) Hailey; Technical University of Munich; Lap 20; 2. (United Arab Emirates) Musa; TII Racing; +47.006; 3. (Italy) Eva; PoliMove; +55.037

Fastest lap
- (Germany) Hailey; Technical University of Munich; 58.183, Lap 20

A2RL's main event, the car race is a standard formula racing format with self-driving formula cars. The cars are made by Dallara and are modified versions of Super Formula cars with Yokohama tires. These cars had the CPUs of their AIs mounted where the driver's seat is on a non-modified chassis, as well as hydraulic actuators for AI control of the vehicle, multiple sensor systems including LIDAR and GPS, and a large LED indicator showing the status of the AI.

The first car race was held on 27 April 2024. This race was marked by the cars' subpar performance: Out of four cars that qualified, only two finished the race - the other two did not. The next race was held on 15 November 2025, with 11 teams.

==== Technical specifications ====
The full list of technical specifications are as follows:

- Chassis: Dallara EAV24 (modified Dallara SF23)
- Forward suspension: Pushrod type, torsion bar spring, adjustable dampers, third element
- Rear suspension: Pushrod type, torsion bar, coil springs, adjustable dampers, third element
- Tires: Yokohama Advan
- Drive-by-wire system: Provided by Meccanica 42, the DBW system consists of steering and brake actuators, with a central ECU that coordinates the driving actions and reacts to any critical situation in real-time.
- Brakes: Brembo calipers, Brembo carbon discs, electro-hydraulically activated
- Engine: 4 Piston Racing K20C1 (based on Honda 2.0l; turbocharged 4-cylinder engine)
- Gearbox: 3MO 6-speed gearbox
- Sensor suite: 7x Sony IMX728 cameras, 4x ZF ProWave radar units, 3x Seyond Falcon Kinetic lidar units
- Main computer: Neousys RGS-8805GC

==== Races held ====
A2RL Car Races list
Year	Date	Total teams	Qualifying teams	Pole position	Winner	Fastest lap	Report
2024	27 April	8	4	Eva (PoliMove, Italy)	Hailey (TUM, Germany)	Gianna (Unimore, Italy)	Report
2025	15 November	11	6	Hailey (TUM, Germany)	Hailey (TUM, Germany)	Hailey (TUM, Germany)	Report
2026	TBD	12	TBD	TBD	TBD	TBD	Report

=== Drone Race ===
Created in partnership with the Drone Champions' League, the drone race is the quadcopter drone racing aerial format of the A2RL. The first race was held on 11/12 April 2025 at the ADNEC Marina Hall. 10 teams are scheduled to take part.

=== Buggy Race ===
The buggy race will be the off-road format of the A2RL using self-driving dune buggies. No date or number of teams has been announced for the first race.

=== Other events ===
A2RL is known to host AI vs AI and Human vs AI events, in Abu Dhabi and abroad. One such event took place at the Suzuka Circuit in Japan. The Human vs AI race was precluded due to AI car "Yalla" crashing into the wall during the formation lap.

== Team lists ==
A2RL Car race teams
Team name	Nationality	First entered	2024 result	2025 result
Fly Eagle	China/UAE	2024	P7 (DNQ)	N/A
Code19 Racing	United States	2024	P6 (DNQ)	N/A
Constructor University	Germany	2024	P2	P6 (DNF)
Kinetiz	Singapore/UAE	2024	P8 (DNQ)	P4
Humda Lab	Hungary	2024	P5 (DNQ)	N/A
PoliMove	Italy	2024	P4 (DNF)	P3
Unimore	Italy	2024	P3 (DNF)	P5 (DNF)
Technical University of Munich	Germany	2024	P1/Winner	P1/Winner
Aladin Innovation	France	2025	N/A	-
SEVRUS Japan	Japan	2025	N/A	-
TII Racing (Note: Partner team)	UAE	2025 (Note: This team held a mock 1v1 duel against former F1 driver Danill Kvyat in 2024)	N/A	P2

A2RL Drone race teams
Team name	Nationality	First entered	2025 AI Grand Challenge	2025 AI vs Human Challenge	2025 Multi-drone Race	2025 Drag Race
ALP Autonomy	Singapore	2025	TBD			
CVAR-UPM	Spain	2025	TBD			
Flyby TU Wien	Austria	2025	TBD			
Fly Eagle	China/UAE	2025	TBD			
KAIST	South Korea	2025	TBD		2nd	
MAVLAB Delft University of Technology	The Netherlands	2025	1st		3rd	
Team QuetzalC++	Mexico	2025	10th			
Code 19	USA	2025	11th			
TII Racing	United Arab Emirates	2025	2nd		1st	
USTC Tiger	China	2025	TBD			
UTDAR	Canada	2025	7th			
MRS Fly For Future	Czechia	2025	4th		4th	3rd
Kinetiz Racing	Singapore/UAE	2025	5th			

== See also ==
- Indy Autonomous Challenge, active autonomous racing championship focused on simulations and time trial events
- Roborace, defunct autonomous racing championship
