= Yas Marina Circuit =

Motorsport race track in Abu Dhabi, United Arab Emirates

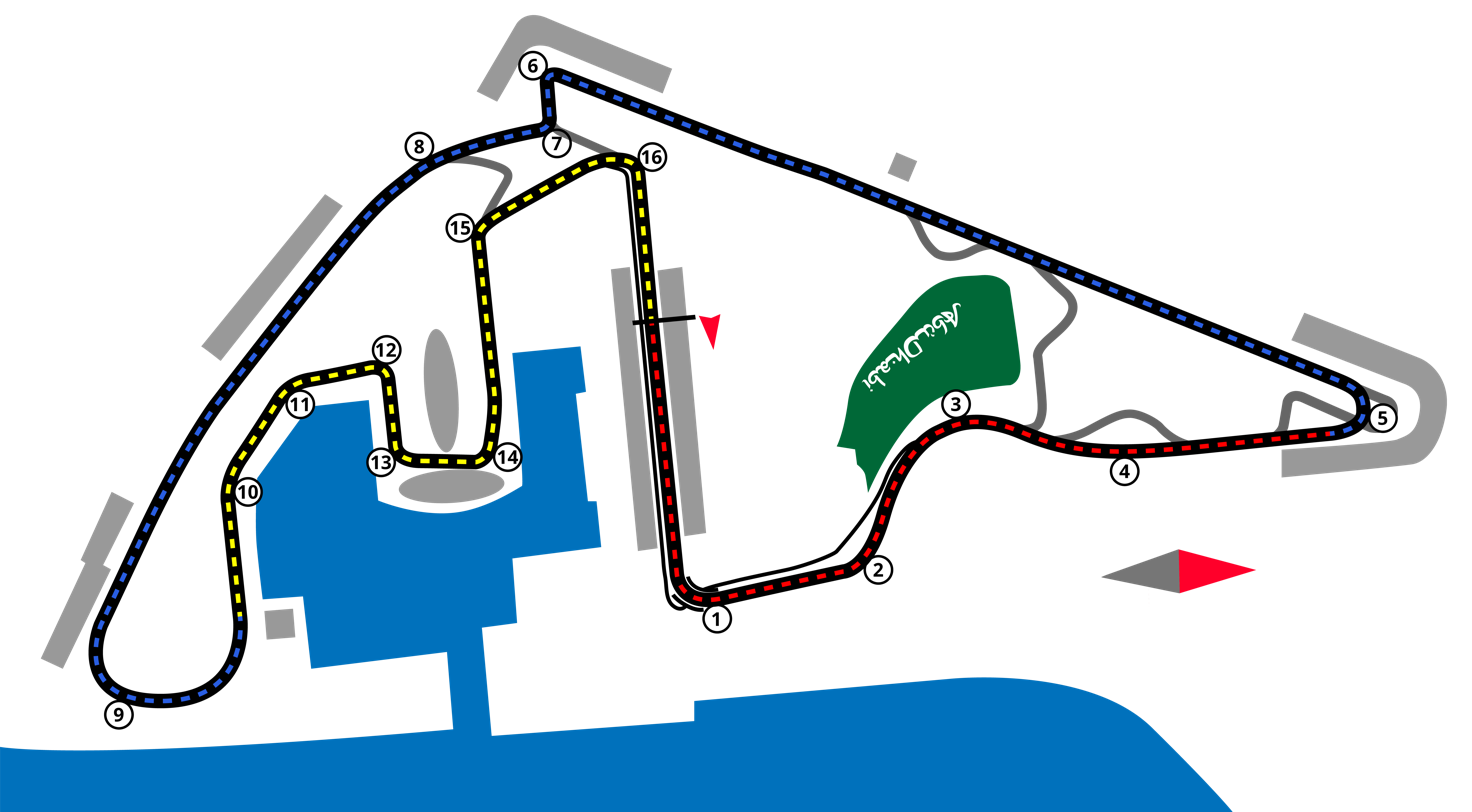
- Yas Marina Circuit (2021–present)
- Location: Yas Island, Abu Dhabi, UAE
- Coordinates: 24°28′2″N 54°36′11″E
- Capacity: 60,000
- FIA Grade: 1 (GP layout); 2 (Corkscrew layout)
- Owner: Government of Abu Dhabi (2009–present)
- Operator: Abu Dhabi Motorsports Management (2009–present)
- Broke ground: May 2007; 19 years ago
- Opened: 30 October 2009; 17 years ago
- Construction cost: US$1.322 billion; AED 4.856 billion
- Architect: Hermann Tilke
- Major events: Current: Formula One; Abu Dhabi Grand Prix (2009–present); Asian Le Mans Series; 4 Hours of Abu Dhabi (2021–2026); 24H Series Middle East; 6 Hours of Abu Dhabi (2023–2026); Former: FIA World RX; World RX of Abu Dhabi (2019); Gulf 12 Hours (2013–2019, 2022–2025); Intercontinental GT Challenge (2022–2023); Ferrari Challenge Asia-Pacific (2016–2017, 2022–2024); Radical World Finals (2024); FIA GT1 World Championship (2010–2011); V8 Supercars Yas Marina Circuit V8 Supercar Event (2010–2012)
- Website: https://www.yasmarinacircuit.com

Grand Prix Circuit (2021–present)
- Length: 5.281 km (3.281 mi)
- Turns: 16
- Race lap record: 1:25.637 ( (Denmark) Kevin Magnussen, Haas VF-24, 2024, F1)

Corkscrew Circuit (2021–present)
- Length: 4.572 km (2.841 mi)
- Turns: 18
- Race lap record: 1:40.480 ( (United Arab Emirates) Rashid Al Dhaheri, Tatuus T-326, 2026, FR)

North Circuit (2021–present)
- Length: 3.005 km (1.867 mi)
- Turns: 8
- Race lap record: 0:58.183 ( (Germany) Hailey (TUM), Dallara EAV24, 2025, A2RL)

Grand Prix Circuit (2009–2021)
- Length: 5.554 km (3.451 mi)
- Turns: 21
- Race lap record: 1:39.283 ( (United Kingdom) Lewis Hamilton, Mercedes W10, 2019, F1)

Corkscrew Circuit (2009–2021)
- Length: 4.730 km (2.939 mi)
- Turns: 19
- Race lap record: 1:37.656 ( (France) Jules Bianchi, Dallara GP2/11, 2011, GP2)

North Circuit (2009–2021)
- Length: 3.130 km (1.945 mi)
- Turns: 10
- Race lap record: 1:10.027 ( (United Kingdom) Olli Caldwell, Tatuus F4-T014, 2018, F4)

South Circuit (2009–2021)
- Length: 2.360 km (1.466 mi)
- Turns: 12
- Race lap record: 0:59.572 ( (South Africa) Jonathan Aberdein, Tatuus F4-T014, 2017, F4)

The Yas Marina Circuit (Arabic: حلبة مرسى ياس) is a 5.281 km (3.281 mi) motorsport circuit situated on Yas Island in Abu Dhabi, United Arab Emirates. The circuit was designed by Hermann Tilke. It has hosted the season-ending Formula One Abu Dhabi Grand Prix since 2009. Yas Marina was the second of four Formula One tracks in the Middle East, with the first being in Bahrain and subsequent tracks in Qatar and Saudi Arabia.

A two-day GP2 Asia Series test was held to officially open the circuit, which was held a week before the 2009 Abu Dhabi Grand Prix. It also hosted V8 Supercars between 2010 and 2012, with the event being the opening round in 2010 and 2011. Outside motorsport, the circuit was used for the final stage of the inaugural Abu Dhabi Tour cycle race in 2015–2017. The circuit has an FIA Grade 1 license.

== Design ==
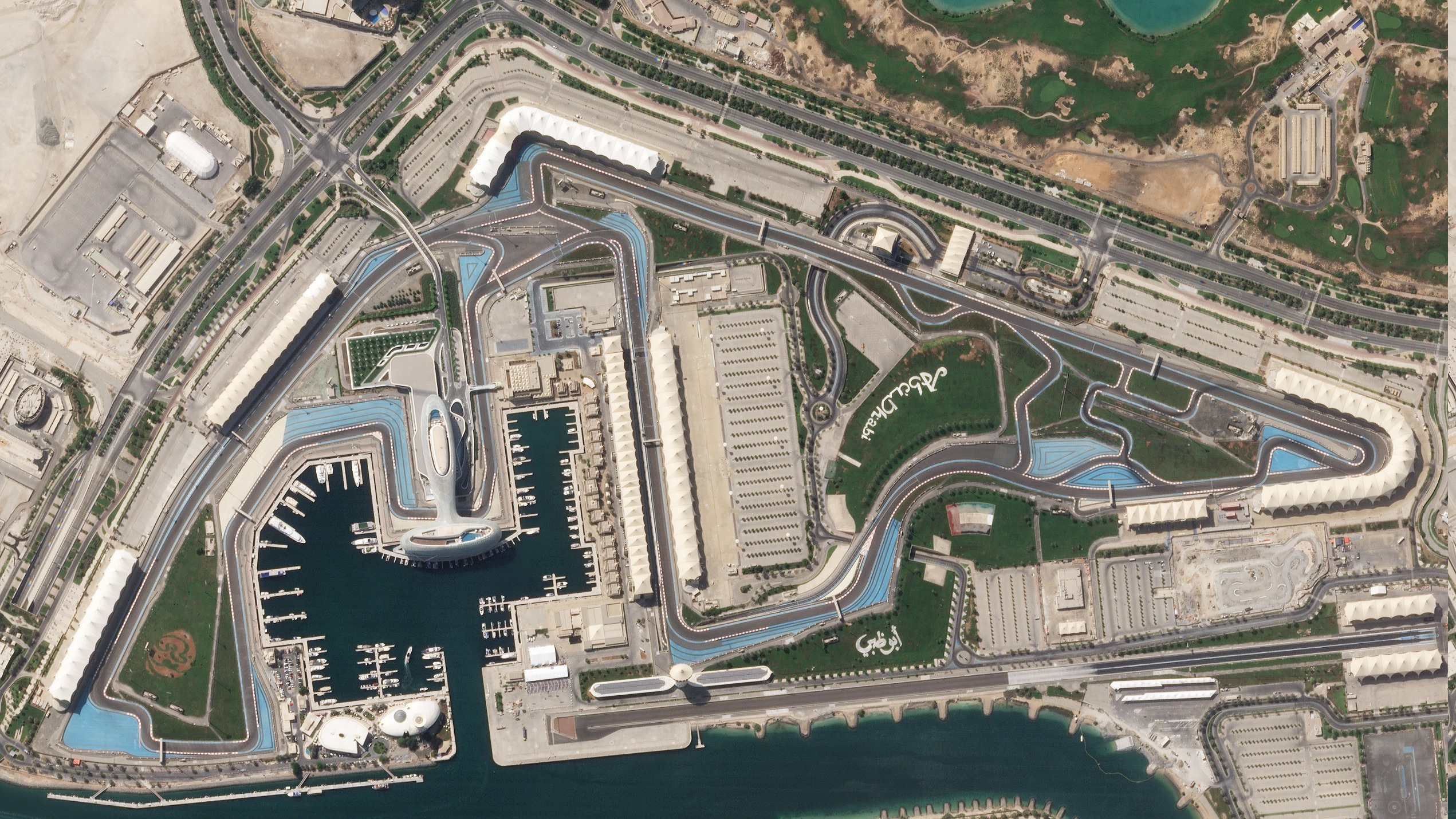
A satellite image of the circuit, as it appeared in 2018

The circuit is located on Yas Island, a headland that was cut off from the mainland by a canal. It has sixteen corners and several straights, and passes by the marina and under the W Abu Dhabi hotel designed by New York-based architects Hani Rashid and Lise Anne Couture of Asymptote Architecture with a facade lighting design by Rogier van der Heide.

The circuit has five grandstand areas (Main Grandstand, West Grandstand, North Grandstand, South Grandstand, and Marina Grandstand) and part of its pit lane exit runs underneath the track. It also houses a team building behind the pit building, Media Center, Dragster Track and VIP Tower. Additionally, one of the run-off areas runs underneath the West grandstand.

This changed when the previous turns 4, 5, and 6 were redesigned and the previous turns 11, 12, and 13 were also reconfigured in time for the 2021 Abu Dhabi Grand Prix.

- Seating Capacity – 60,000
- Area – 161.9 ha (400 acres)
- Length – 5.281 km (3.281 mi)
- Longest straight – 1.14 km (0.71 mi)
- Elevation change – 10.7 m (35 ft)

== Construction ==
The circuit goes under the W Abu Dhabi – Yas Island hotel.

The circuit was built by main contractor Cebarco-WCT WLL, under contract from developer Aldar Properties. Among the sub-contractors involved were KOH AH HING (KAHBINA) from Malaysia (structural contractor), as well as specialised subcontractors like Voltas (MEP), PKE-Siemens (MEP), Able-Middle East (earthworks), Hamilton International (interior), Bau Bickhardt (track), and M.K. Almahri (Digital Systems) to name a few.

The circuit was constructed with a permanent lighting system provided by Musco Lighting, similar to the one installed at Lusail International Circuit in Qatar. Yas Marina Circuit is the largest permanent sports venue lighting project in the world; previously the title had been held by Lusail International Circuit.

The surface of the track is made of graywacke aggregate, shipped to Abu Dhabi from a Bayston Hill quarry in Shropshire, England. The surface material is highly acclaimed by circuit bosses and Formula One drivers for the high level of grip it offers, though at the expense of a higher rate of tyre wear. The same aggregate material is used at the Bahrain International Circuit for the Bahrain Grand Prix.

On 7 October 2009, the circuit was granted final approval to hold Formula One races by the FIA. Bruno Senna was the first driver to complete a test run on the circuit.

GP3 visited Abu Dhabi for the first time at the end of the 2013 season.

== Reception ==
After the first practice sessions at the 2009 Abu Dhabi Grand Prix, the circuit was welcomed by the drivers, with Nico Rosberg commenting that every corner was 'unique', while double World Champion Fernando Alonso echoed his sentiments, stating that it was enjoyable because there was always something to do. Force India's Adrian Sutil rated the circuit as being better than Formula One's other night race in Singapore as he felt there was too much light at Marina Bay.

Not all of the drivers were complimentary, with Giancarlo Fisichella expressing a particular dislike of the pit exit, which dips under the main circuit by way of a tunnel. Although the pit exit remained free of incidents for the early practice sessions, Fisichella claimed that it was both very difficult and dangerous. Kimi Räikkönen notoriously gave his thoughts on the circuit, stating "The first few turns are quite good, but the rest of it is shit".

After the 2017 Abu Dhabi Grand Prix the designer Hermann Tilke said that they were considering making changes to the track to present more overtaking opportunities. BBC Sport's Andrew Benson called the racing in the 2020 event "dreary" with Matt Beer of The Race naming the track layout as one of 6 reasons why the races in Abu Dhabi "consistently disappoint". Drivers such as Daniel Ricciardo have also added their support for track changes.

In June 2021, Saif Al Noaimi, acting CEO of Abu Dhabi Motorsports Management, said modifications to the track's layout had been approved, with the modifications completed in time for the 2021 Abu Dhabi Grand Prix. Turns 4, 5, and 6 were replaced by a single, less severe hairpin, turns 11 through 14 were replaced by a sweeping banked curve, and turns 18 through 20 were made less tight to allow more speed to be carried through them.

== Events ==
Current

- January: 24H Series Middle East 6 Hours of Abu Dhabi, Formula Regional Middle East Championship, F4 Middle East Championship, Porsche Carrera Cup Middle East, Gulf Radical Cup
- February: Asian Le Mans Series 4 Hours of Abu Dhabi, UAE Procar Championship, Gulf Radical Cup, Porsche Carrera Cup Middle East
- December: Formula One Abu Dhabi Grand Prix, FIA Formula 2 Championship Yas Island Formula 2 round

Future

- Ferrari Challenge Middle East (2027)

Former

- Abu Dhabi Autonomous Racing League (2024–2025)
- Abu Dhabi Tour (2015–2017)
- Audi R8 LMS Cup (2014)
- F1 Academy (2024)
- Ferrari Challenge Asia-Pacific (2016–2017, 2022–2024)
- Ferrari Challenge Finali Mondiali (2014)
- FIA GT1 World Championship (2010–2011)
- FIA World Rallycross Championship
  - World RX of Abu Dhabi (2019)
- Formula 4 UAE Championship (2016–2024)
- Formula Regional Asian Championship (2020–2022)
- Formula Renault Eurocup (2019)
- Formula Trophy UAE (2024–2025)
- GP2 Series (2010, 2013–2016)
- GP2 Asia Series (2009–2011)
- GP3 Series (2013–2018)
- Gulf 12 Hours (2013–2019, 2022–2025)
- Intercontinental GT Challenge
  - Gulf 12 Hours (2022–2023)
- MRF Challenge Formula 2000 Championship (2015, 2017)
- Porsche Supercup (2009, 2011, 2013)
- Radical World Finals (2024)
- TCR Middle East Series (2017–2019)
- Trofeo Maserati (2013–2015)
- V8 Supercars
  - Yas Marina Circuit V8 Supercar Event (2010–2012)

== Lap records ==
As of February 2026, the fastest official race lap records at the Yas Marina Circuit are listed as:

Category	Time	Driver	Vehicle	Event
Grand Prix Circuit (November 2021–present): 5.281 km (3.281 mi)
F1	1:25.637	Kevin Magnussen	Haas VF-24	2024 Abu Dhabi Grand Prix
FIA F2	1:37.445	Roy Nissany	Dallara F2 2018	2021 Abu Dhabi Formula 2 round
LMP2	1:40.725	Tom Dillmann	Oreca 07	2024 4 Hours of Abu Dhabi Race 1
LMP3	1:48.198	Laurents Hörr	Duqueine M30 D-08	2022 4 Hours of Abu Dhabi Race 2
Formula Regional	1:48.779	Rashid Al Dhaheri	Tatuus T-326	2026 1st Abu Dhabi Formula Regional Middle East round
GT3	1:51.291	Maro Engel	Mercedes-AMG GT3 Evo	2023 Gulf 12 Hours
GT2	1:54.182	Jack Mitchell	Ginetta G56 GT2	2026 6 Hours of Abu Dhabi
Formula 4	1:54.671	Andrea Kimi Antonelli	Tatuus F4-T421	2022 1st Abu Dhabi Formula 4 UAE round
Porsche Carrera Cup	1.54.751	Robert de Haan	Porsche 911 (992 I) GT3 Cup	2026 Abu Dhabi Porsche Carrera Cup Middle East round
Radical Cup	1:54.840	Alim Geshev	Radical SR3 XXR	2024 Gulf Radical World Finals
Lamborghini Super Trofeo	1:55.013	Mikkel Mac	Lamborghini Huracán LP 620-2 Super Trofeo Evo	2025 6 Hours of Abu Dhabi
Ferrari Challenge	1:56.889	Christian Brunsborg	Ferrari 488 Challenge Evo	2022 Abu Dhabi Ferrari Challenge Asia-Pacific round
GT4	2:03.091	Cameron McLeod	Toyota GR Supra GT4 Evo	2025 6 Hours of Abu Dhabi
TCR Touring Car	2:06.197	Alexandros Annivas	CUPRA León TCR	2023 1st Abu Dhabi Gulf ProCar round
Alpine Cup	2:07.073	Loic Labeda	Alpine A110 Cup	2026 6 Hours of Abu Dhabi
Renault Clio Cup	2:16.338	Jerzy Spinkiewicz	Renault Clio R.S. V	2023 2nd Abu Dhabi Renault Clio Cup Middle East round
Abu Dhabi Autonomous Racing League	2:19.267	Gianna (UNIMORE)	Dallara EAV24	2024 Abu Dhabi Autonomous Racing League
Corkscrew Circuit (November 2021–present): 4.572 km (2.841 mi)
Formula Regional	1:40.480	Rashid Al Dhaheri	Tatuus T-326	2026 2nd Abu Dhabi Formula Regional Middle East round
Formula 4	1:46.687	Emanuele Olivieri	Tatuus F4-T421	2025 2nd Abu Dhabi F4 Middle East round
Radical Cup	1:47.668	Ian Aguilera	Radical SR3 XXR	2025 2nd Abu Dhabi Gulf Radical Cup round
Ferrari Challenge	1:47.707	Masoud Jaberian Mahmoud	Ferrari 296 Challenge	2025 1st Abu Dhabi Gulf ProCar round
Porsche Carrera Cup	1:48.655	Alex Giannone	Porsche 911 (992 I) GT3 Cup	2025 1st Abu Dhabi Gulf ProCar round
Renault Clio Cup	2:06.357	Stanislav Novikov	Renault Clio R.S. V	2024 2nd Abu Dhabi Renault Clio Cup Middle East round
North Circuit (November 2021–present): 3.005 km (1.867 mi)
Abu Dhabi Autonomous Racing League	0:58.183	Hailey (TUM)	Dallara EAV24	2025 Abu Dhabi Autonomous Racing League
Ferrari Challenge	1:02.180	Khaled Almarzouq	Ferrari 488 Challenge Evo	2024 1st Abu Dhabi Gulf ProCar round
Radical Cup	1:04.194	Luke Hilton	Radical SR3	2024 1st Abu Dhabi Gulf Radical Cup round
GT4	1:06.277	Keith Gatehouse	Mercedes-AMG GT4	2024 1st Abu Dhabi Gulf ProCar round
Porsche Carrera Cup	1:06.996	Mohammed Al Hammadi	Porsche 911 (992 I) GT3 Cup	2023 2nd Abu Dhabi Gulf ProCar round
TCR Touring Car	1:08.599	René Münnich	Honda Civic Type R TCR (FK8)	2023 2nd Abu Dhabi Gulf ProCar round
Supersport	1:12.509	Saeed Al Sulaiti	Yamaha YZF-R6	2024 Abu Dhabi DSBK round
Renault Clio Cup	1:15.411	Ilya Sidorov	Renault Clio R.S. V	2024 1st Abu Dhabi Renault Clio Cup Middle East round
Grand Prix Circuit (October 2009–June 2021): 5.554 km (3.451 mi)
F1	1:39.283	Lewis Hamilton	Mercedes AMG F1 W10 EQ Power+	2019 Abu Dhabi Grand Prix
FIA F2	1:50.314	Alexander Albon	Dallara GP2/11	2017 Abu Dhabi Formula 2 round
GP2	1:50.110	Giedo van der Garde	Dallara GP2/08	2010 Abu Dhabi GP2 round
LMP2	1:56.560	Franco Colapinto	Aurus 01	2021 4 Hours of Abu Dhabi Race 2
GP3	1:56.888	Marvin Kirchhöfer	Dallara GP3/13	2014 Abu Dhabi GP3 round
LMP3	2:05.165	Malthe Jakobsen	Ligier JS P320	2021 4 Hours of Abu Dhabi Race 1
Formula Regional	2:07.324	Jamie Chadwick	Tatuus F3 T-318	2020 Abu Dhabi F3 Asia round
GT1	2:07.376	Thomas Mutsch	Matech Ford GT1	2010 Abu Dhabi FIA GT1 round
GT3	2:08.791	Ben Barnicoat	McLaren 720S GT3	2021 4 Hours of Abu Dhabi Race 2
MRF Challenge	2:10.674	Felipe Drugovich	Dallara Formulino Pro	2017 Abu Dhabi MRF Challenge round
Formula 4	2:11.046	Charles Weerts	Tatuus F4-T014	2018 2nd Abu Dhabi Formula 4 UAE round
Porsche Carrera Cup	2:11.371	Dylan Pereira	Porsche 911 (991 II) GT3 Cup	2020 Abu Dhabi Porsche Sprint Challenge Middle East round
Audi R8 LMS Cup	2:12.246	André Couto	Audi R8 LMS ultra	2014 Abu Dhabi Audi R8 LMS Cup round
V8 Supercars	2.13.160	Jamie Whincup	Holden VE Commodore	2012 Abu Dhabi V8 Supercar round
Ferrari Challenge	2:15.130	Philipp Baron	Ferrari 458 Challenge Evo	2014 Ferrari Challenge Finali Mondiali
Radical Cup	2.15.229	Jani Hjerppe	Radical SR3	2018 1st Abu Dhabi Radical Middle East Cup round
Trofeo Maserati	2:18.823	Ange Barde	Maserati Trofeo	2013 Abu Dhabi Trofeo Maserati Corse World Series round
GT4	2:21.240	Olli Caldwell	Mercedes-AMG GT4	2018 Gulf 12 Hours
TCR Touring Car	2:21.896	Josh Files	Honda Civic Type R TCR (FK2)	2017 Abu Dhabi TCR Middle East round
Short (Corkscrew) Circuit (October 2009–June 2021): 4.730 km (2.939 mi)
GP2	1:37.656	Charles Pic	Dallara GP2/11	2011 Abu Dhabi GP2 Asia round
GT1	1:52.431	Maxime Martin	Matech Ford GT1	2011 Abu Dhabi FIA GT1 round
Formula Regional	1:53.432	Jehan Daruvala	Tatuus F3 T-318	2021 1st Abu Dhabi F3 Asian Championship round
GT3	1:56.203	Rob Barff	Ferrari 458 Italia GT3	2011 3rd Yas Marina UAE GT round
Formula 4	1:57.198	Dilano van 't Hoff	Tatuus F4-T014	2021 2nd Abu Dhabi Formula 4 UAE round
V8 Supercars	1:57.740	Jason Bargwanna	Holden VE Commodore	2011 Yas V8 400
North Circuit (October 2009–June 2021): 3.130 km (1.945 mi)
Formula 4	1:10.027	Olli Caldwell	Tatuus F4-T014	2018 1st Abu Dhabi Formula 4 UAE round
TCR Touring Car	1:14.778	Luca Engstler	Volkswagen Golf GTI TCR	2018 Abu Dhabi TCR Middle East round
South Circuit (October 2009–June 2021): 2.360 km (1.466 mi)
Formula 4	0:59.572	Jonathan Aberdein	Tatuus F4-T014	2017 2nd Abu Dhabi Formula 4 UAE round

== Gallery ==
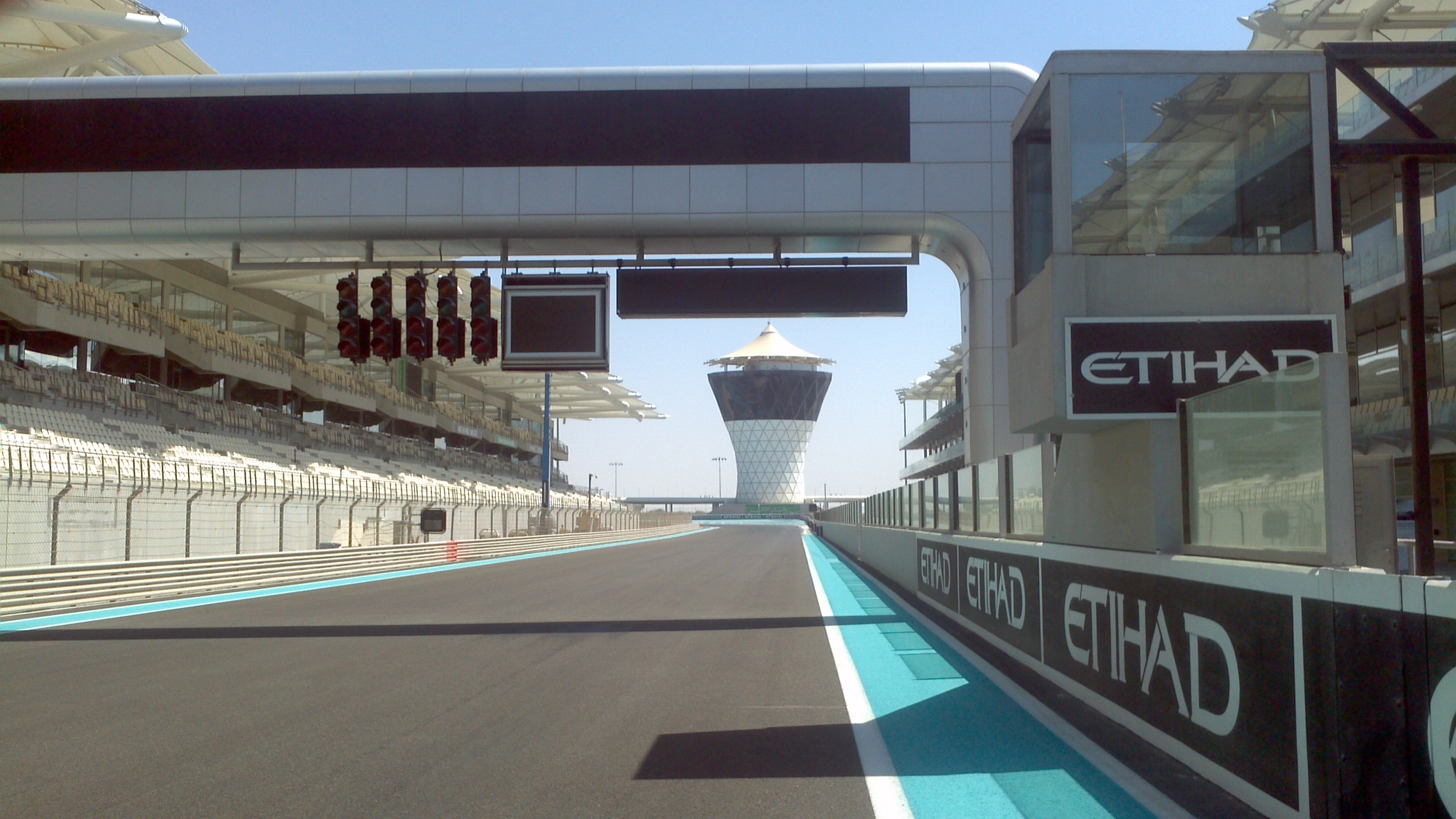
The main straight

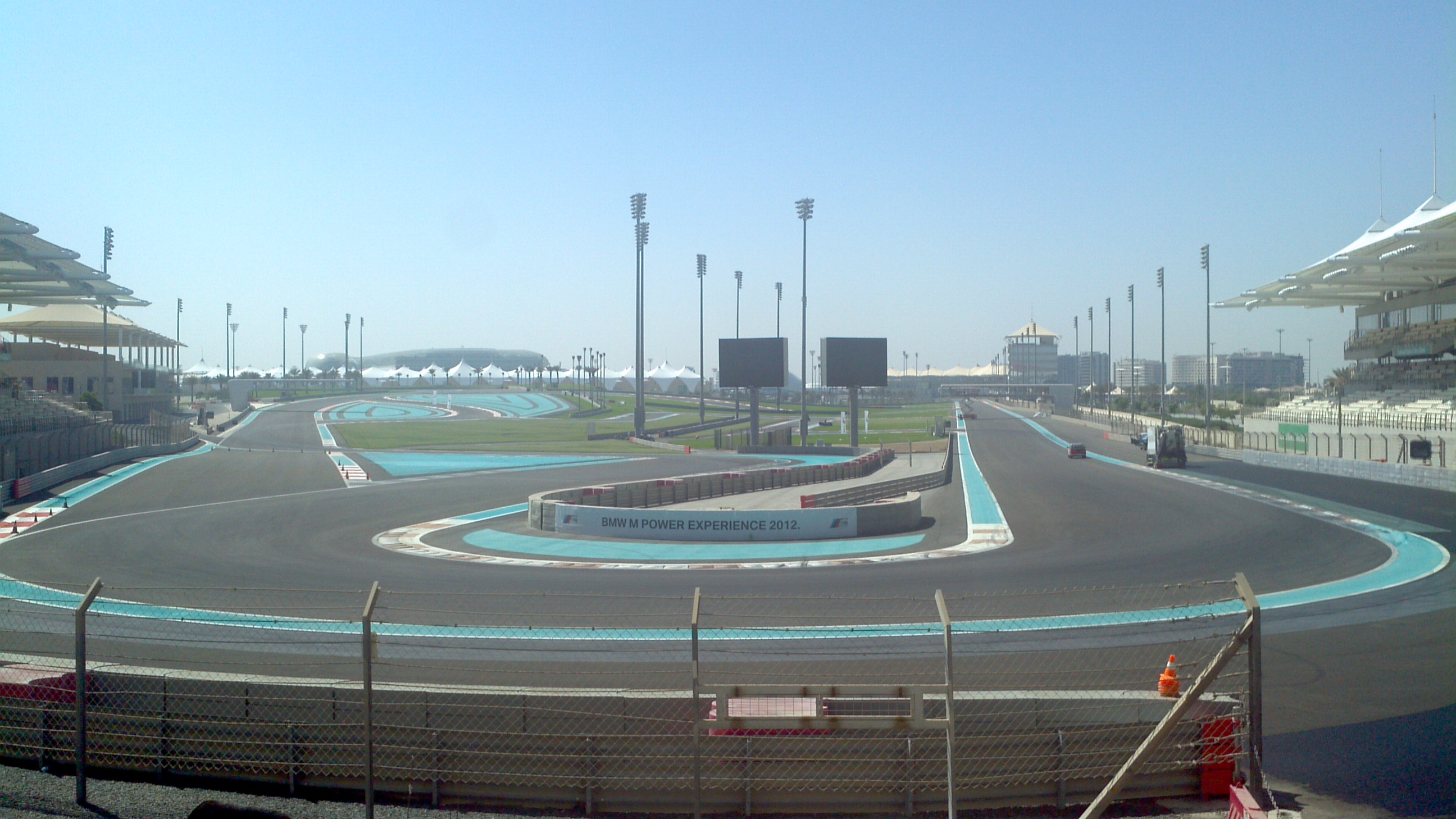
Turn 7 (October 2009–June 2021), Turn 5 (November 2021–present)

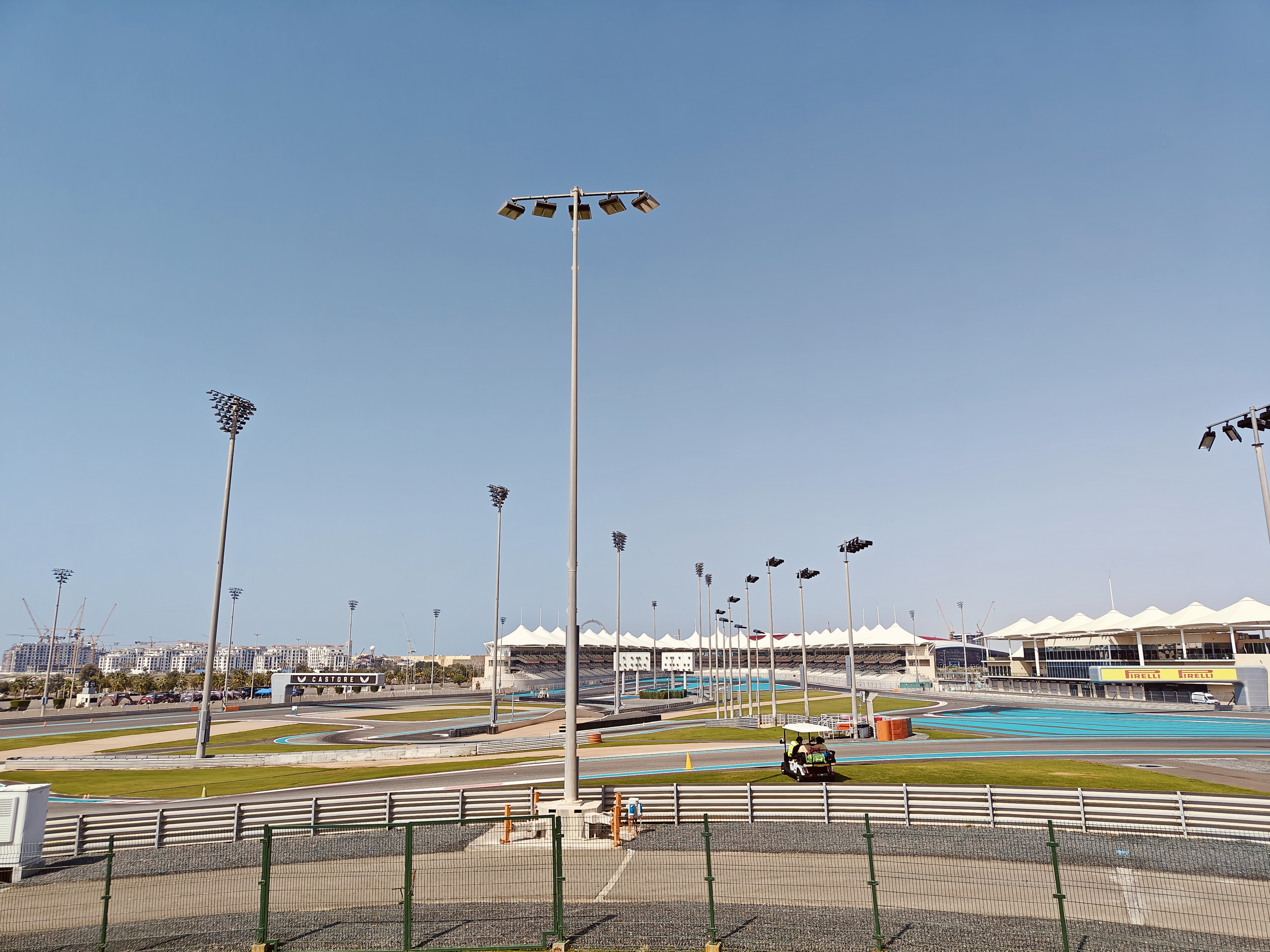
North Grandstand, seen from Abu Dhabi Hill

Grand Prix Circuit (October 2009–June 2021)

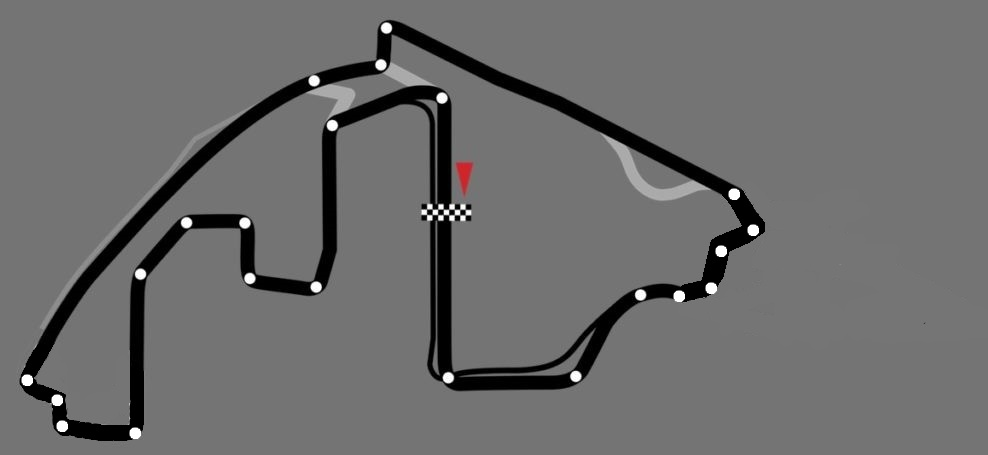
Corkscrew Circuit (October 2009–June 2021)

North circuit and south circuit layouts shown in Grand Prix Circuit track map (October 2009–June 2021)

World RX layout of Yas Marina Circuit, used in 2019

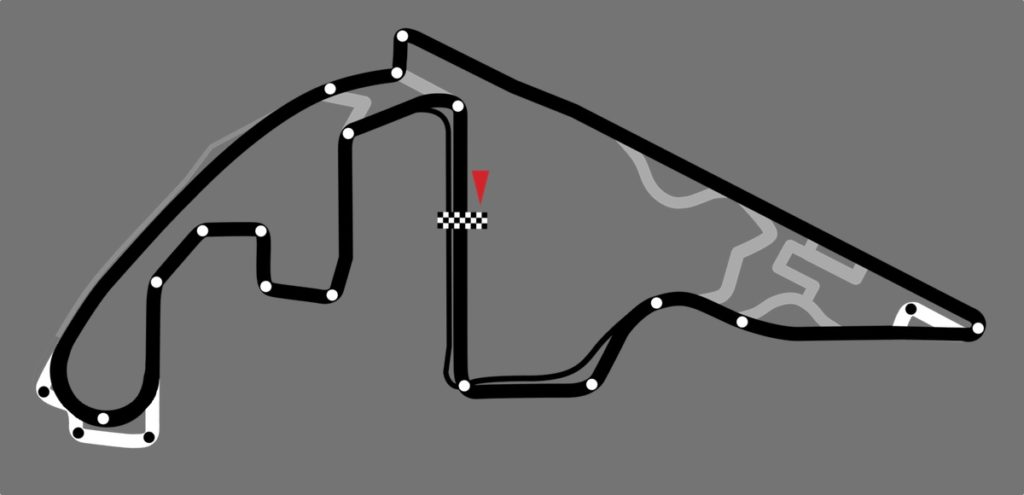
Differences between the 2009 and 2021 layouts, with the new layout in black

== See also ==
- List of Formula One circuits
