= Autonomous racing =

Evolving sport

Autonomous racing, self-driving racing or autonomous motorsports is an evolving sport of racing ground-based wheeled vehicles, controlled by computer. A number of events and series have launched, including the international Formula E spin-off series Roborace. and Self Racing Cars as well as student competitions such as Formula Student Driverless.

== Background ==
Autonomous racing is relatively new, and is a technology that is rapidly increasing. Roborace is the company starting the world's first motorsports series for driverless cars. The Indy Autonomous Challenge (IAC) started in 2021 and was the first head-to-head race between autonomous racing vehicles. As of July 2023, the IAC is the only active autonomous racing championship.

== Technology ==
In early 2016, Roborace started working on world's first ever self-driving race car, the so called "Devbot." In August 2016, DevBot successfully ran twelve laps around the Moulay El Hassan race track in Marrakesh. Following battery issues in Hong Kong the team reluctantly abandoned the run. DevBot, weighs 974.77 kilograms. The majority of the car is made of carbon fiber and has four 300 kW motors and a 540 kW battery, with speeds capable of over 199 mph. The car has plenty of aids to help it see all around including six AI cameras, five LIDAR arrays, two radar arrays, 18 ultrasonic sensors, two optical speed sensors and GNSS positioning. It also has a Nvidia Drive PX2 which acts as the car's brain. The driving algorithms work by first observing the entire track with its sensors and then analyzing the entire track with its AI chip to find the shortest path around the track. It will be programmed allowing up to 24 trillion AI operations per second. Roborace's DevBot looks suspiciously like a real car.

The DevBot has a standardized safety cell for a driver, and it has a seat for a driver, allowing for both human and machine to drive the vehicle. Its hardware is used for testing and development. Robocar cars are deployed at a low speed, so-called, “explorer mode” and track data in this mode by using sensors such as LIDARS, radars, ultrasonics, and cameras to determine the fastest route around the track. The car's final design is to have four wheels hiden inside the vast aerodynamic scoops. It will be made out of carbon fiber weighing 2,150 pounds (980 kg) and have dimensions of 189 inches (4.8 m) in length and 79 inches (2.0 m) in width.

== Accidents ==
The DevBot crashed in its demonstration race. It rammed into a wall barrier when a dog ran out into the field during its representation.

== Future ==
Porsche is developing autonomous car technology to enable a driver to experience hands free how a professional motor racing champion would tackle a racetrack. They are aiming to use software that will capture data from professional drivers as they rip around a racecourse. It will then upload the data so a self driving Porsche can replicate the entire driving experience on the track.

Roborace has ambitions to be the new global motorsport series, the long-term plan is to pit teams autonomous vehicles paired with human drivers against others on the track.

== List of autonomous racing championships ==
Series	Years	Category
DARPA Grand Challenge	2004–2007	Baja
Roborace	2017–2020	Sports Prototype
Formula Student Driverless	2019–present	Formula Student
Indy Autonomous Challenge	2021–present	Open Wheel
Autonomous Karting Series	2023–present	Karting
Abu Dhabi Autonomous Racing League	2024–present	Open Wheel

== Records ==
On March 21, 2019 Roborace's Robocar was awarded the Guinness World Records title for 'Fastest Autonomous Car' after registering 282.42 km/h (175.49 mph), an average set after two runs of RAF Elvington Airfield, Yorkshire, UK.

This record has since been overtaken by the AV-21 autonomous Indy Lights car operated by PoliMove (Polytechnic of Milan) and the Indy Autonomous Challenge. In April 2022, the car drove a record of 309 km/h in Cape Canaveral, Florida, USA.
