= Dallara SF23 =

Open-wheel formula racing car built by Dallara

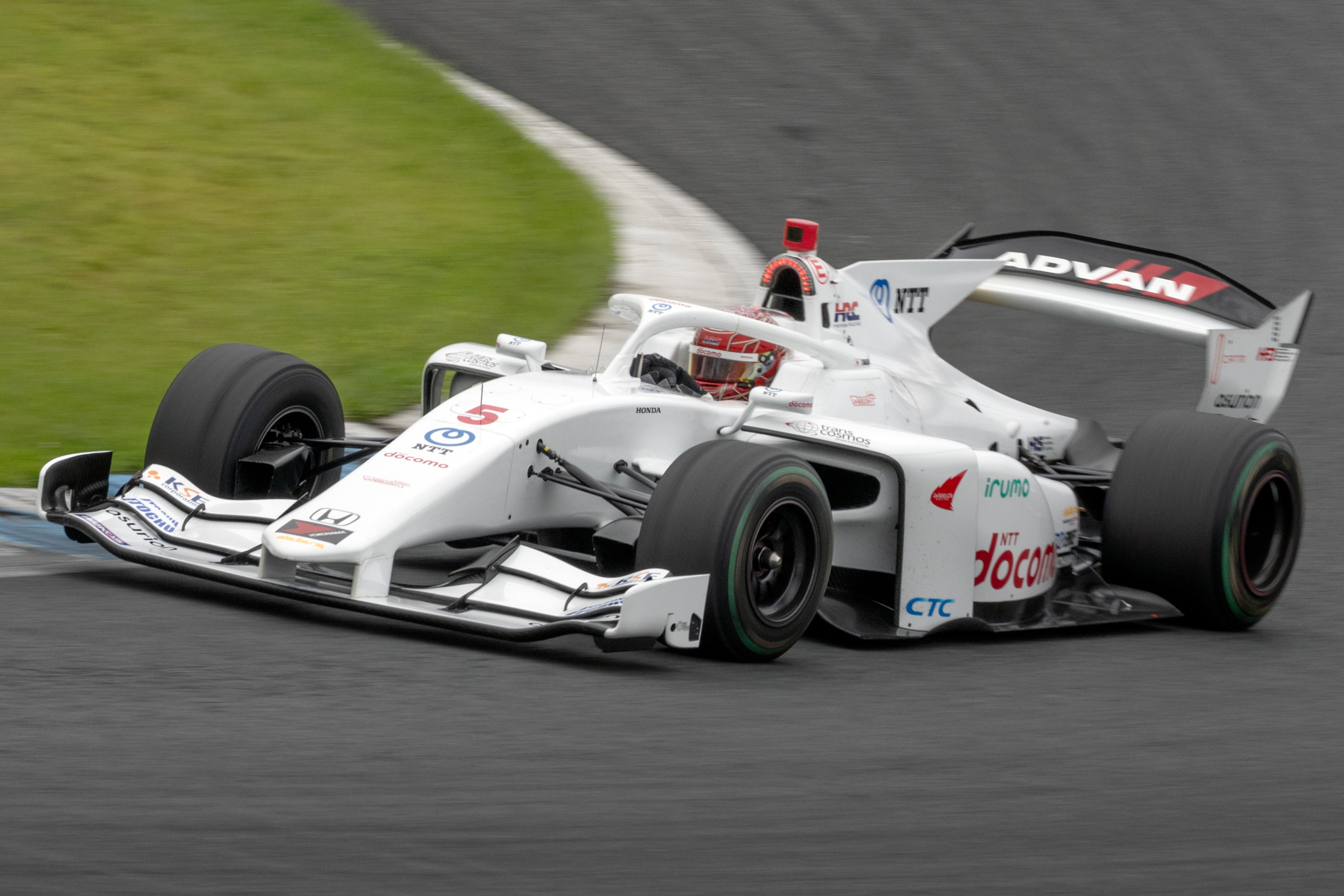
- Tadasuke Makino driving a SF23 at the 2024 Super Formula Motegi round.
- Category: Super Formula
- Constructor: Dallara
- Predecessor: Dallara SF19

Technical specifications
- Engine: Honda HR-417E or Toyota TRD-01F 2,000 cubic centimetres (122.0 cu in; 2.0 L) I4 Turbocharged mid-mounted
- Transmission: 6 forward + 1 reverse semi-automatic paddle-shift
- Power: 550 brake horsepower (557.6 PS; 410.1 kW) + 51 brake horsepower (51.7 PS; 38.0 kW) (Push-to-Pass); 540 newton-metres (398.3 lbf⋅ft) + 65 newton-metres (47.9 lbf⋅ft) (Push-to-Pass)
- Weight: 650 kilograms (1,433.0 lb)
- Brakes: Calipers: Brembo (carbon); Discs: Brembo (carbon)
- Tires: Yokohama Advan

Competition history
- Notable entrants: All Super Formula entrants
- Notable drivers: All Super Formula entrants
- Debut: 2023

The Dallara SF23 is an open-wheel single-seater chassis produced by Dallara for use in the Japanese Super Formula Championship. It debuted in 2023, replacing the Dallara SF19 chassis as the main chassis used in Super Formula.

== History ==
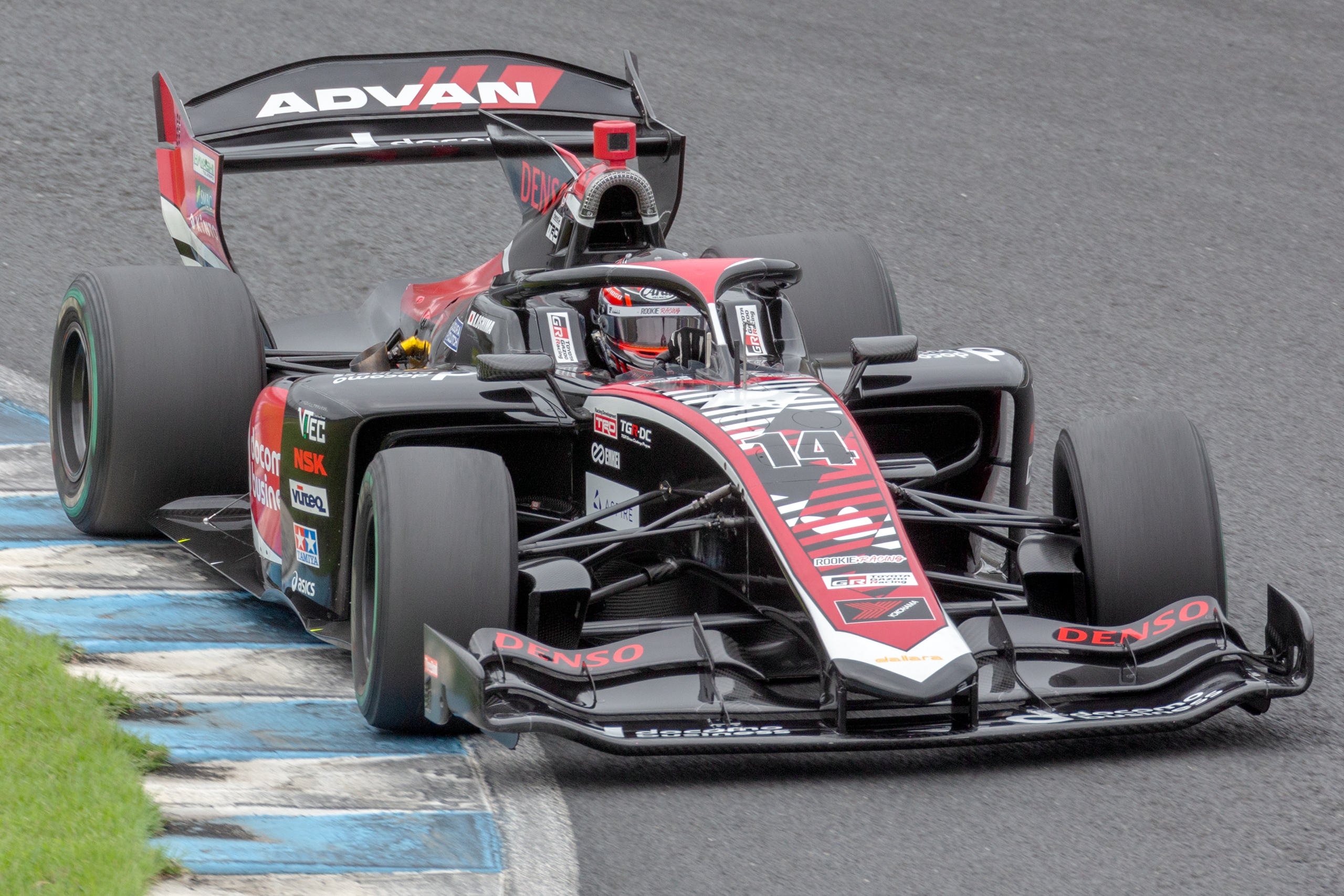
Kazuya Oshima driving the SF23 at the 2024 Super Formula Motegi round

The single-seater SF23 was presented on 13 December 2022. The car was developed through seven test sessions, covering 10,000 km (6,200 mi).

== Specifications ==
Compared to its predecessor, the SF23 has important aerodynamic differences in order to guarantee a greater possibility of overtaking. The ailerons, bellies and bottom are modified. Like the SF19, it is equipped with engines supplied by Honda or Toyota.

For some components of the bodywork, materials derived from flax fiber, cork and recycled carbon fiber are used. This allows for a 75% reduction in carbon dioxide emissions in the production process.

== Variants ==
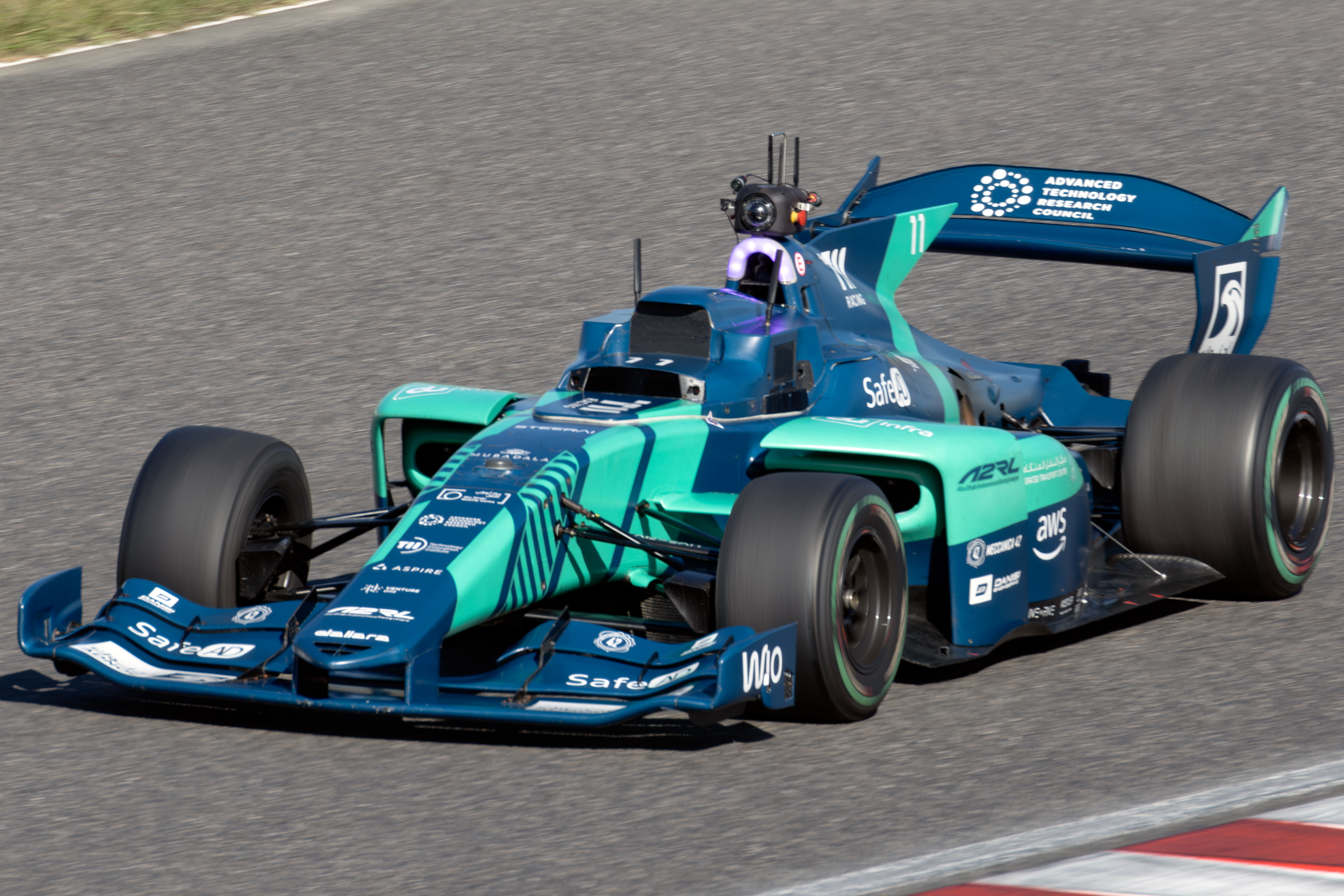
EAV-24 in self-driving configuration and TII racing livery.

A modified version built for autonomous racing designated EAV-24 is in use at the Abu Dhabi Autonomous Racing League. The EAV-24 had multiple modifications for self-driving racing, including a new sensor suite with cameras, RADAR, LIDAR and GPS, as well as a Honda K20C1 engine. A manned EAV-24 configuration exists.

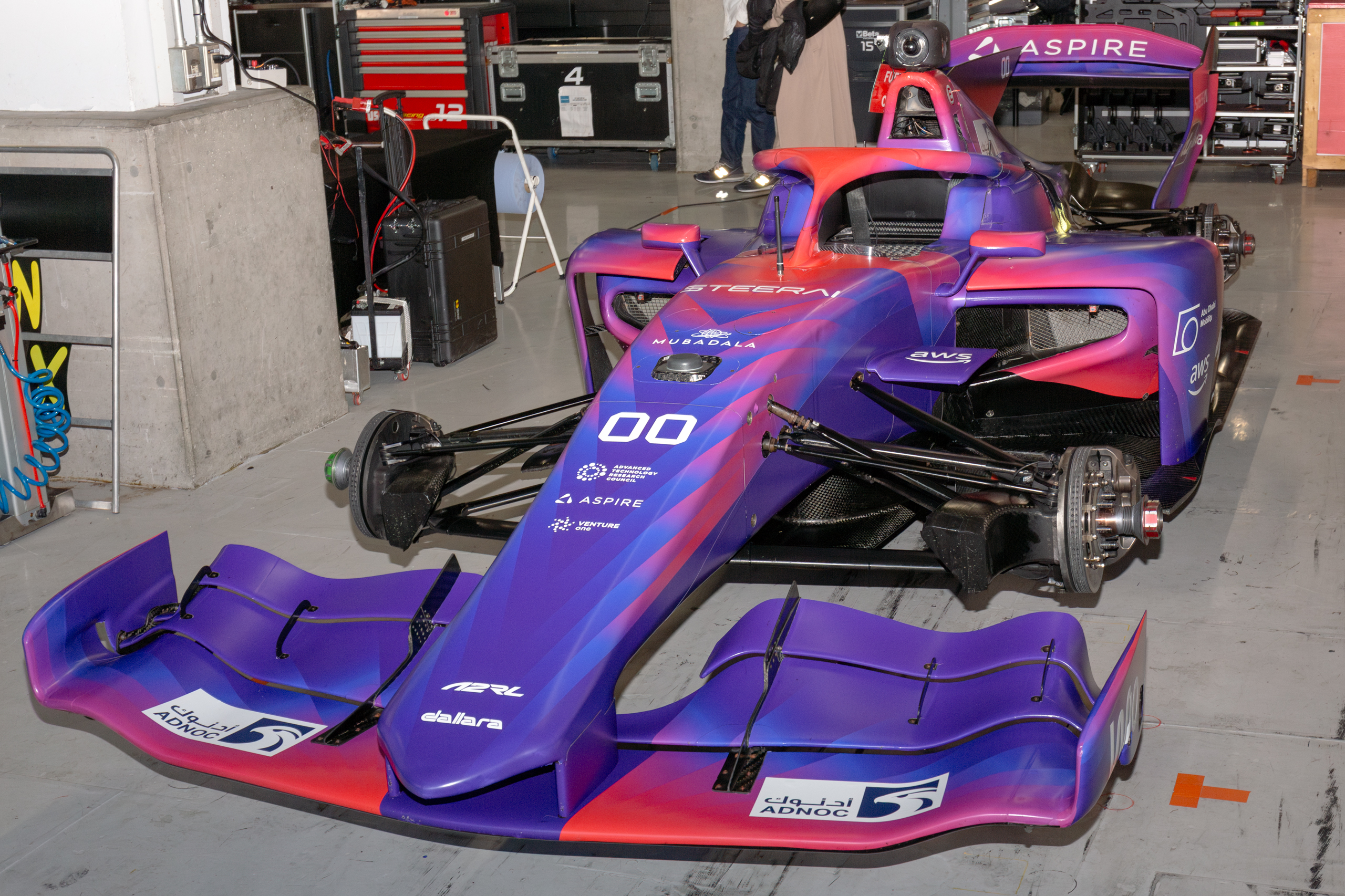
EAV-24 in manned configuration (without tyres).
