= Indy Autonomous Challenge =

Autonomous motorsport racing series

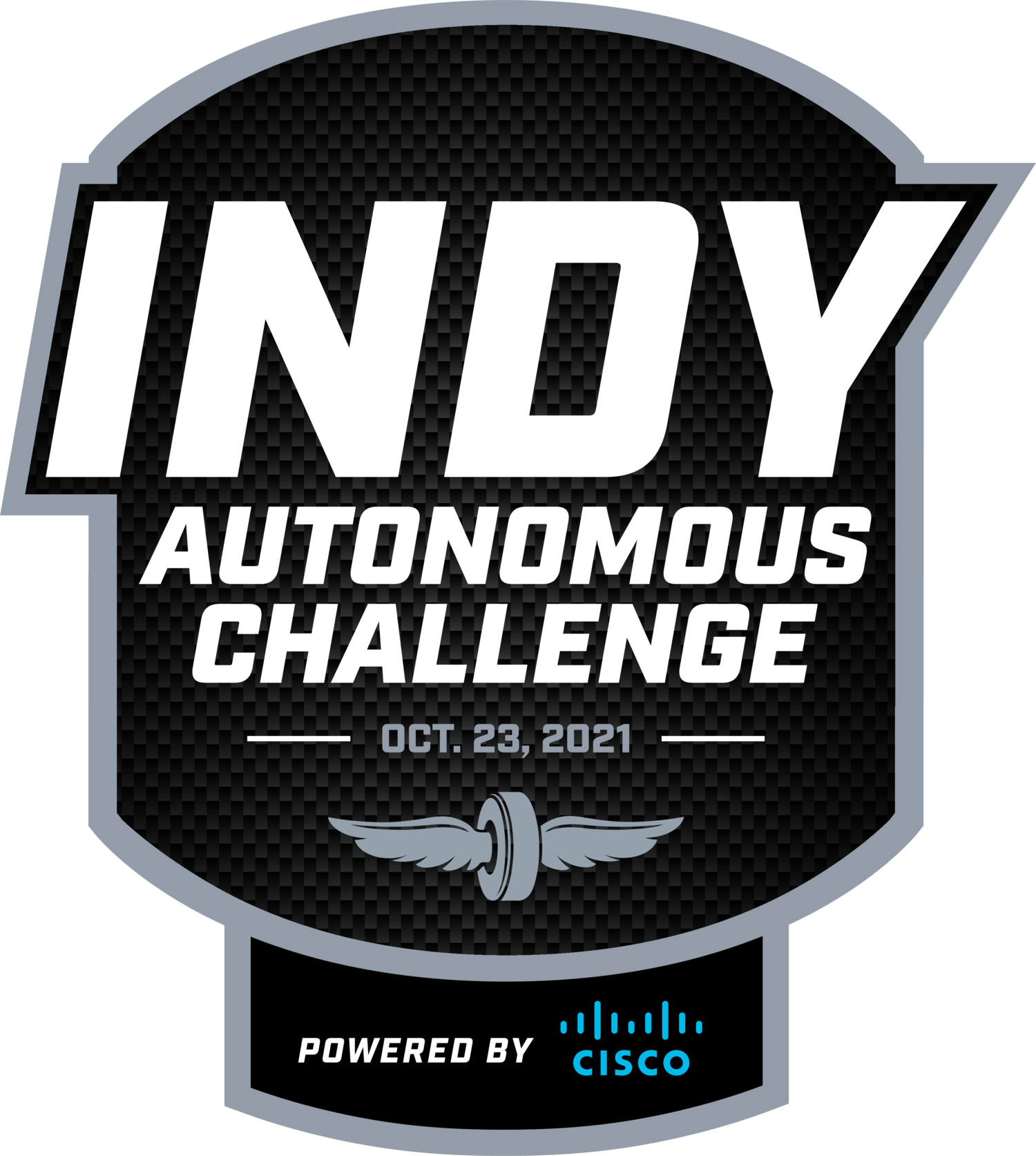
- Logo of the first 2021 race
- Country: United States; Italy
- Inaugural season: 2021
- Teams: 10
- Constructors: Dallara
- Tyre suppliers: Bridgestone
- Current champions: 2-car passing event: (Italy) PoliMOVE Autonomous Racing Team, fastest-lap time trial: (United States) Cavalier Autonomous Racing
- Official website: indyautonomouschallenge.com

The Indy Autonomous Challenge (IAC) is the main and, between July 2023 and April 2024, the only active racing series for autonomous race cars. The vehicles participating in the IAC are SAE level 4 autonomous as they are capable of completing circuit laps and overtaking maneuvers without any human intervention.

Exclusively made up of student/university teams, each team participating in the competition uses the same vehicle, a custom-built Dallara AV single-seater. The AV-21 was derived from Dallara's IL-15 model with the addition of sensors, actuators and computing hardware necessary for fully autonomous driving. By 2024, the series was using the Dallara AV-24 specification, with the same base Dallara chassis but an entirely re-engineered compute hardware, sensor suite, and software stack. The participating teams are made up of university researchers from universities worldwide, including Massachusetts Institute of Technology, Carnegie Mellon University, University of Pittsburgh, KAIST, Politecnico di Milano, TUM, University of Modena and Reggio Emilia, ETH Zurich, University of Virginia and Purdue University.

The first race took place in October 2021 on the Indianapolis Motor Speedway (IMS), after an initial three-year period of simulator-only challenges, which started in November 2019 as a proving ground to allow competing teams to develop and demonstrate the ability to race autonomously before receiving the physical race car. Since then, the competition has raced on several notable oval circuits such as Las Vegas Motor Speedway and Texas Motor Speedway, and in June 2023 in its first road course circuit, at the Monza Circuit.

Over the four years of on-track IAC competitions, the challenge has advanced to include two competitive events. Beginning in 2021, individual time trials are run by all teams over the course, and the event is scored with the fastest lap achieved in five minutes on an oval track. Later, a multicar event was added: a two-car scripted passing competition, with increasingly higher speeds assigned to the lead car, where the two cars "keep passing each other like a game of cat and mouse until one of them has to give up, or they have an accident.”

By 2024, the autonomous racecars were achieving top-speeds on oval circuits of 171 mph (275 km/h) and the two-car passing races were achieving successful passes of a fixed-speed vehicle maintaining 160 mph.

== Motivation and summary of achievements ==
As a successor of the DARPA Grand Challenge, the IAC aimed to provide a challenging environment for the development of autonomous vehicles. University teams were invited to develop software for solving the autonomous driving task, in the challenging environment of a racetrack, constrained by IAC rules through 2024 that limit only one or two cars to be on the race track at a time, and limit the autonomous control approach to only six camera sensors on the vehicle.

During the competition, teams used simulation environments and cloud computing to test and prove the maturity of their algorithms. As the IAC race cars were to drive on track up to 290 km/h (180 mph) with high lateral and longitudinal accelerations, the software needed to plan a path in an adversarial environment and to drive safely and reliably with low computation times.

Overall, three main goals were set for the IAC in 2021:

1. Defining and solving edge case scenarios for autonomous vehicles;
2. Catalyzing new autonomous driving technologies and innovations;
3. Engaging the public in the competition to help ensure acceptance.

The efforts of the IAC were initially led by Energy System Network, an Indianapolis-based nonprofit. The goal of the IAC was to focus on the development of a full autonomous driving software stack that enabled perception, planning and control on the racetrack.

During its multiple years of operation, the IAC achieved a number of records, beyond the speed records for an autonomous vehicle on every racetrack the competition visited. The Autonomous land speed record, as of 2022 was obtained on 28 April 2022, on the Kennedy Space Center runway, where a Dallara AV-21 reached the speed of 309.3 km/h (192.2 mph)

The scientific research from the IAC teams has led to several academic publications, mostly on the topics of automatic control, path planning and robotic perception.

== History ==
=== IAC Simulation Race ===
In order to qualify for the participation in the real championship, the participating teams had first to show their autonomous driving capabilities on a simulator, by completing a series of hackathon challenges of increasing difficulty, starting from a solo lap and simple obstacle avoidance to 1-to-1 full races. The simulation environment provided the teams with a perfect replica of the Indianapolis Motor Speedway and of the Dallara AV-21 Racecar.

The simulation-only competition peaked with the IAC Simulation Race, which took place on June 30, 2021. It consisted of a qualification round, where the teams had to complete their fastest solo lap, with time penalties attributed for violating the track limits. Then, the teams were split into two 8-vehicle semifinal races in order to qualify for the final.

In the semifinals and in the final, many vehicles were disqualified for causing collisions with other vehicles, with the race stopped and re-started every time a collision happened. The final times of the semi-finals were used to determine the running order of the final race, which concluded with the victory of team PoliMOVE, which started from pole position and defended its place along the 10 laps.

The winning team was awarded US$100,000, while the second place team (TUM Autonomous Motorsport) received US$50,000

==== Indy Autonomous Challenge Simulation Race Final Standings ====
Team	University	Qualification	Semifinal	Final
PoliMOVE	(Italy) Politecnico di Milano	1	1	1
TUM Autonomous Motorsport	(Germany) Technical University of Munich	5	2	2
Reveille Racing	(United States) Texas A&M University	13	4	3
MIT-PITT Autonomous	(United States) Massachusetts Institute of Technology (MIT) (United States) University of Pittsburgh	10	5	4
WUT Driverless	(Poland) Warsaw University of Technology	3	1	DNF
Ariel Team	(Israel) Ariel University	7	3	DNF
AI Racing Tech	(United States) University of Hawaii (United States) University of California, San Diego	6	2	DNF
KAIST	(South Korea) Korea Advanced Institute of Science and Technology	9	DNF	DNQ
Autonomous Tiger Racing	(United States) Auburn University	2	DSQ	DNQ
Black & Gold Autonomous Racing	Purdue University; United States Military Academy (West Point)	4	DSQ	DNQ
Watorace	(Canada) University of Waterloo	8	DSQ	DNQ
Cavalier Autonomous Racing	(United States) University of Virginia	11	DSQ	DNQ
Crimson Autonomous Racing	(United States) University of Alabama	12	DSQ	DNQ
Pegasus - RIT Autonomous Racing	(United States) Colorado State University (United States) Rochester Institute of Technology (United States) Western Michigan University	14	DSQ	DNQ
Euroracing	(Italy) University of Modena and Reggio Emilia (Italy) University of Pisa (Poland) Polish Academy of Sciences (Switzerland) ETH Zurich	15	DSQ	DNQ
IUPUI - IITKGP-USB	(United States) Indiana University-Purdue University Indianapolis (India) Indian Institute of Technology Kharagpur (Colombia) Universidad De San Buenaventura	16	DSQ	DNQ

- DSQ = Disqualified
- DNQ = Did Not Qualify
- DNF = Did Not Finish

=== IAC autonomous vehicle races ===
==== IAC at the Indianapolis Motor Speedway, 2021 ====
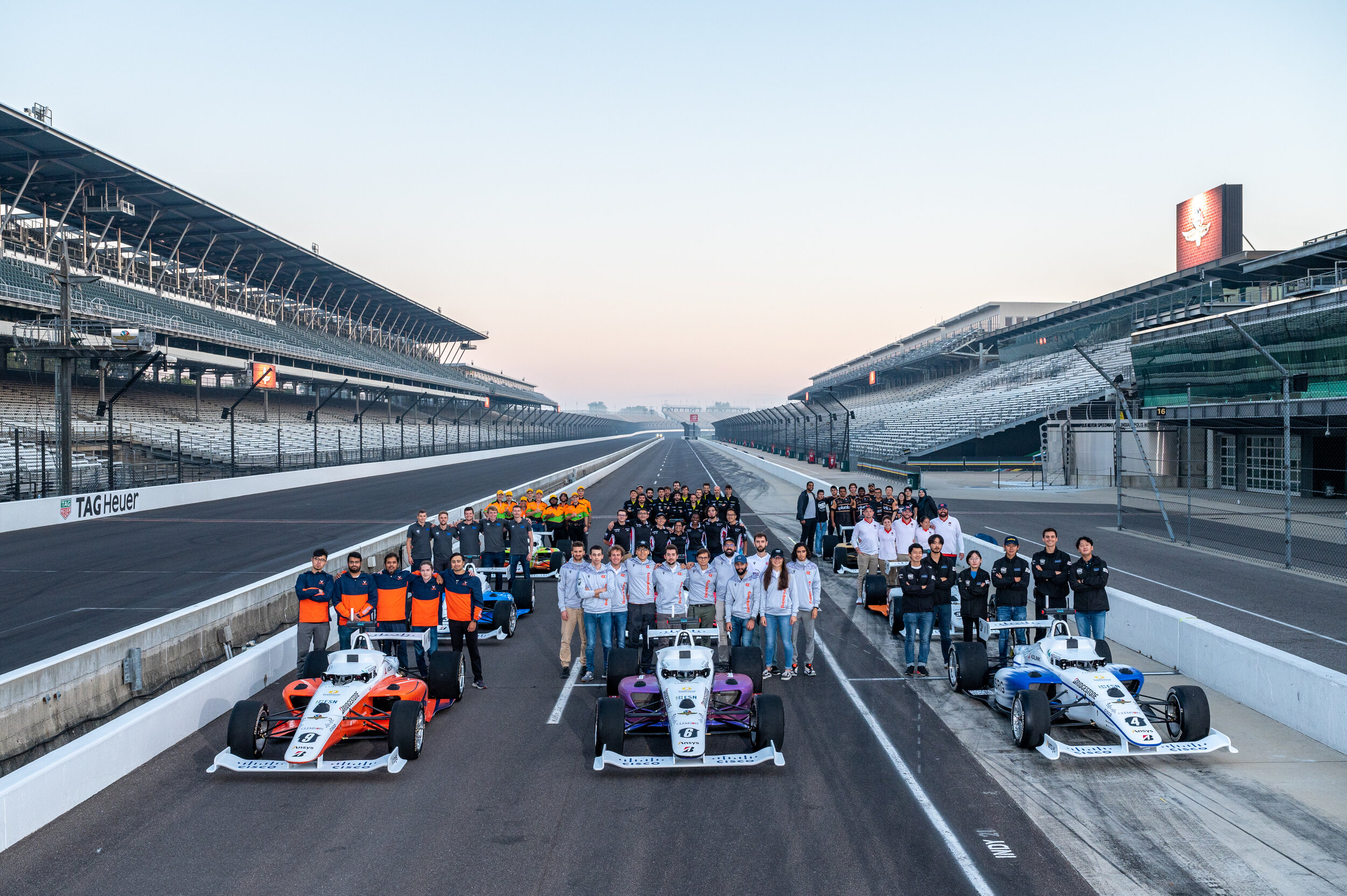
The teams at IMS with their racecars in October 2021

After the simulation race, 9 teams purchased the vehicle, and were admitted to the first physical race. Some of the teams participating in the simulation race merged in order to split the financial burden.

The Indy Autonomous Challenge at the Indianapolis Motor Speedway (IMS) took place on October 23, 2021. Although in the original intentions of the organizers it should have been a full 10-vehicle traditional race as it had been the case of the IAC Simulation Race, eventually the scope of the competition was reduced to a time trial event with an obstacle avoidance test.

The race, together with its US$1,000,000 prize, was won by TUM Autonomous Motorsport after many teams had to retire from the competition due to crashes, with Euroracing on the second place of the podium, while PoliMOVE crashed against the wall but, as it had already scored its time, was granted the third place.

==== IAC at the Las Vegas CES, 2022 ====
The next Indy Autonomous Challenge competition took place on January 7, 2022, at the Las Vegas Motor Speedway (LVMS), as the final event of the 2022 edition of the Consumer Electronics Show. The event itself was limited to CES attendees but was live streamed. After the single-vehicle time trials of the Indianapolis event, it was decided to have another competition with the autonomous race cars, this time with more than a vehicle on the track.

To simplify the task for the teams, the "Overtaking Game" format was chosen for the race, where a defender car had to keep a constant speed, while an attacker vehicle had to complete the overtake before the end of the lap. Once the overtake had been completed, the roles would swap and the defender speed would be increased. The teams had to perform a complete and safe overtake on track in the test days before the event in order to qualify for the race matches, which were held on a tennis-style elimination tournament. To further simplify the environment, the defender was forced to stay on the inside of the turns.

After winning the semi-final race against KAIST, PoliMOVE won the 2022 IAC Las Vegas Race by successfully completing an autonomous overtake over TUM Autonomous Motorsport defending at 150 mph (240 km/h). The German team spun out of control after performing an overly aggressive obstacle avoidance manoeuvre while car #5 (PoliMOVE) was ultimating its overtake.

==== IAC 2022-2023 Season ====
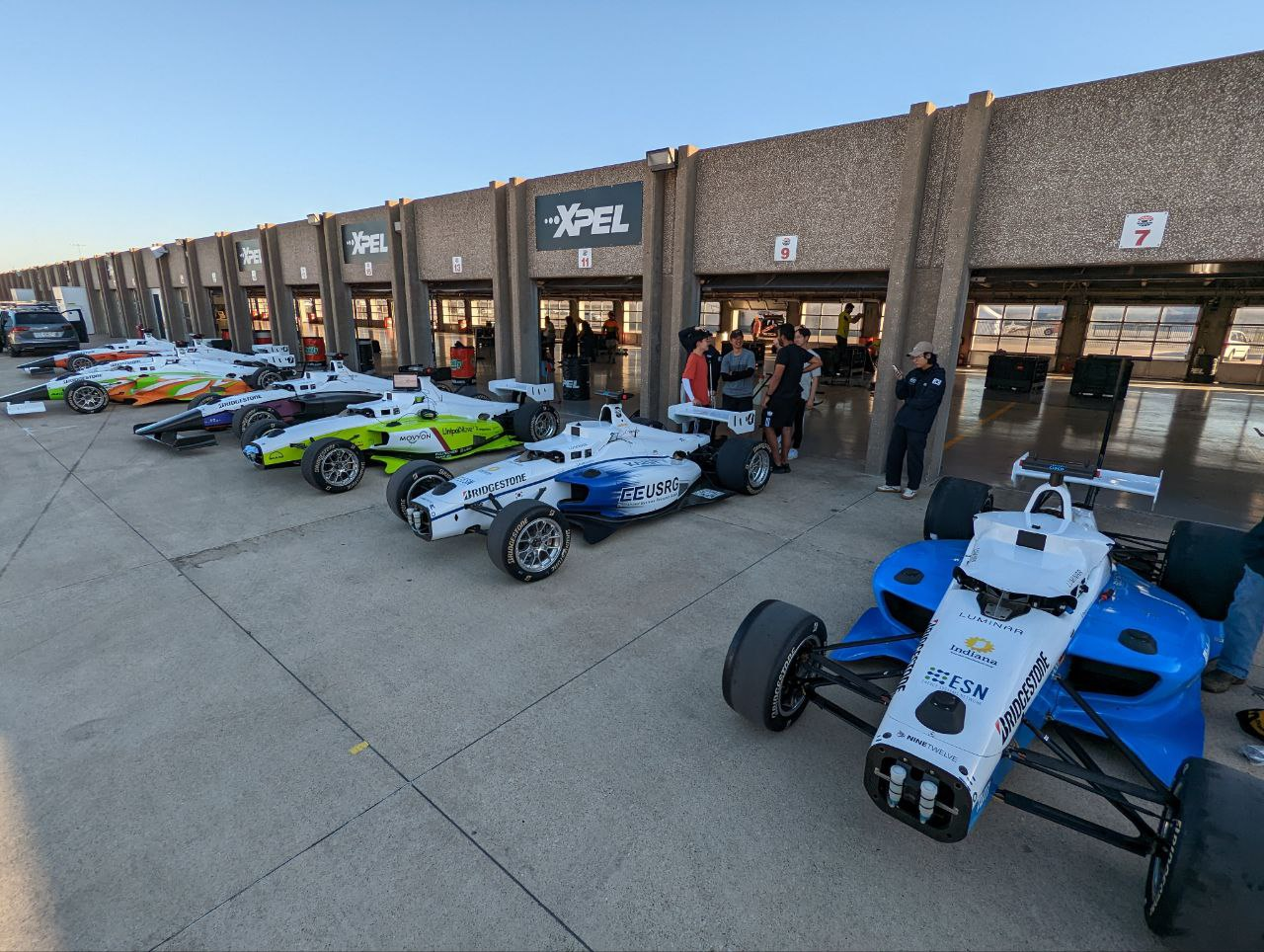
IAC racecars in the garage of the Texas Motor Speedway

The success of the 2022 IAC competition in Las Vegas encouraged the series to expand towards new circuits. Consumer Technology Association renovated the IAC's contract to perform at the 2023 Consumer Electronics Show in Las Vegas. After a summer break and a vehicle refresh, which included an increase of the engine power and new sensors and computing equipment, the cars were brought to Fort Worth, Texas for the next challenge.

The Indy Autonomous Challenge at the Texas Motor Speedway (TMS) took place in November 2023. A major change in the rules with respect to the 2022 Las Vegas edition consisted in the increased freedom of the defender vehicle to choose its trajectory, although right of way and minimum longitudinal and lateral separation rules were introduced to increase the safety of the competition.

The race took place on a cold and wet racetrack after a morning of heavy rain. Similar to what had happened during the Simulation Race, many teams were disqualified due to either causing a collision or simply violating the minimum distance between the cars, as their algorithms could not safely handle the increased opponent freedom. Team PoliMOVE won the final race against AI Racing Tech.

The 2023 Indy Autonomous Challenge at the Las Vegas Motor Speedway took place on January 7, 2023, following the same ruleset of the 2022 TMS Race. As the teams' software progressed, more advanced vehicle interaction and less incidents happened with respect to the TMS race.

Team PoliMOVE won again, reaching a top speed of around 180 mph (289.682 km/h) during the event and beating its own speed record from the previous year.

==== IAC at MIMO 2023 ====
At the 2023 Las Vegas event, the IAC announced its intention of coming to Europe, at the Autodromo Nazionale di Monza in Italy, as part of the 2023 MIMO event. Five IAC teams participated in the event, which took place on June 16–18, 2023.

Due to the increased difficulty of running on road course circuits with respect to ovals and the lack of complete GPS coverage of the track, the event format was once again a single vehicle time trial competition. Team PoliMOVE scored the fastest lap, while TUM Autonomous Motorsport took second place and TII Unimore Racing (formerly Euroracing) was on the lowest step of the podium.

==== IAC at Las Vegas CES 2024 ====
At CES®2024, the Indy Autonomous Challenge unveiled the IAC AV-24- the next-gen autonomous vehicle platform in the racing series. Teams PoliMOVE, TII Unimore Racing, and AI Racing Tech demonstrated autonomous laps with the AV-24 cars at the Las Vegas Motor Speedway on January 11th, 2024.

The remaining teams with the older AV-21 autonomous cars participated in the autonomous passing challenge. TUM Autonomous Motorsport faced Cavalier Autonomous Racing from University of Virginia in the final round. The Cavalier race car accelerated as the defending car in the final round which is prohibited by the competition rules and the round had to end with TUM Autonomous Motorsport declared as the winner, and Cavalier Autonomous Racing finishing second. The first Semi-Final took place between MIT-PITT-RW and Cavalier Autonomous Racing with Cavalier Autonomous Racing passing the MIT-PITT-RW car at 143 mph before the round ended. The second Semi-Final saw TUM Autonomous Motorsport go head-to-head against KAIST with TUM emerging as the winner of the semi-final.

==== IAC at the Indianapolis Motor Speedway, 2024 ====
The second IAC race at the Indianapolis Motor Speedway was run on 6 September 2024, three years after the first autonomous Indy Autonomous Car race was first run on this track. Ten teams of students—almost all graduate students— from 19 engineering schools competed.

Even though this was the fourth year of the IAC competition, the races are still restricted to just two competitive events. Individual time trials are run by all teams, and the event is scored with the fastest lap achieved in five minutes on the track. The only multicar event is a two-car scripted passing competition, with increasingly higher speeds assigned to the lead car, where the two cars "keep passing each other like a game of cat and mouse until one of them has to give up, or they have an accident.”

The time trial winner was Cavalier Autonomous Racing from the University of Virginia (car #9) at 171 mph (275 km/h). The winner of the passing competition was the Italian team PoliMOVE-MSU (car #5) where the lead car was limited to 160 mph (260 km/h) and Poli-MOVE-MSU passed it, briefly achieving a speed of 10–20 miles per hour faster. The second place team in the passing competition was unable to pass car #5 at the 160 mph increment, but had successfully passed at the 155 mph increment.

=== Indy Autonomous Challenge series results ===
The results from most of the actual car races, 2021 through 2024, are summarized in the following table.

Car No.	Team	University	Indianapolis 2021	Las Vegas 2022	Texas 2022	Las Vegas 2023	Monza 2023	Las Vegas 2024
5	PoliMOVE	(Italy) Politecnico di Milano (United States) University of Alabama	3	1	1	1	1	DNA
3	TUM Autonomous Motorsport	(Germany) Technical University of Munich	1	2	DSQ	2	2	1
6	TII Euroracing / Unimore Racing	(Italy) University of Modena and Reggio Emilia (Italy) University of Pisa (Poland) Polish Academy of Sciences (Switzerland) ETH Zurich	2	DNF	3	DNS	3	DNA
4	KAIST	(South Korea) Korea Advanced Institute of Science and Technology	4	3	DSQ	DSQ	4	3
8	MIT-PITT-RW	(United States) Massachusetts Institute of Technology (MIT) (United States) University of Pittsburgh (United States) Rochester Institute of Technology (Canada) University of Waterloo	DNF	DNQ	4	4	5	4
7	AI Racing Tech	(United States) University of Hawaii (United States) University of California, San Diego	DNF	DNQ	2	3	DNA	DNA
34	Autonomous Tiger Racing	(United States) Auburn University	DNF	5	DNQ	DNQ	DNA	5
9	Cavalier Autonomous Racing	(United States) University of Virginia	5	DNQ	DNQ	DNQ	DNA	2
2	Black & Gold Autonomous Racing	Purdue University; United States Military Academy at West Point (Colombia) Universidad De San Buenaventura	DNS	DNA	DNA	DNA	DNA	DNQ

- DSQ = Disqualified
- DNA = Did Not Attend
- DNF = Did Not Finish
- DNQ = Did Not Qualify
- DNS = Did Not Start

== Dallara AV racecar ==
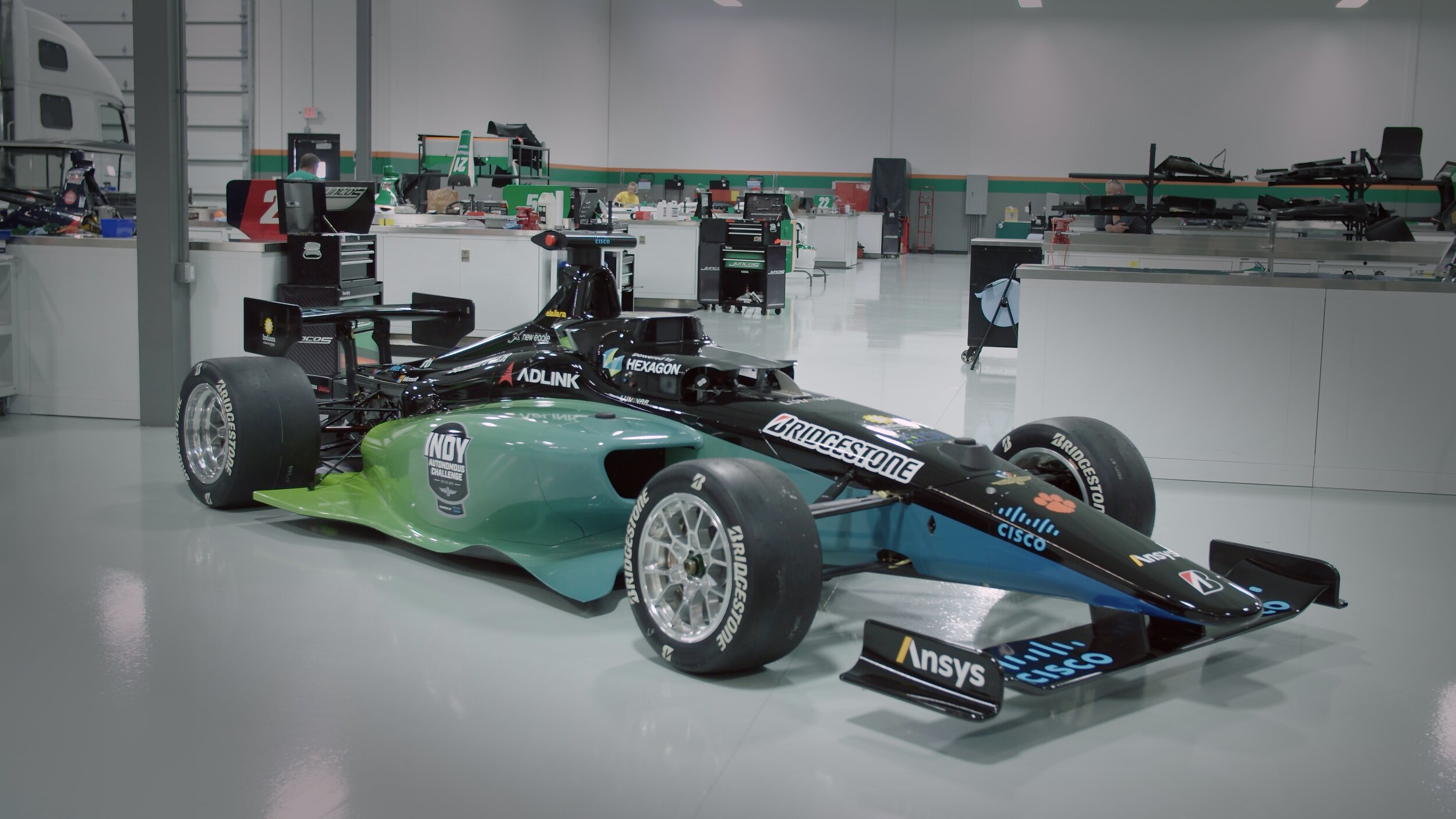
The Dallara AV-21 Prototype at Clemson University

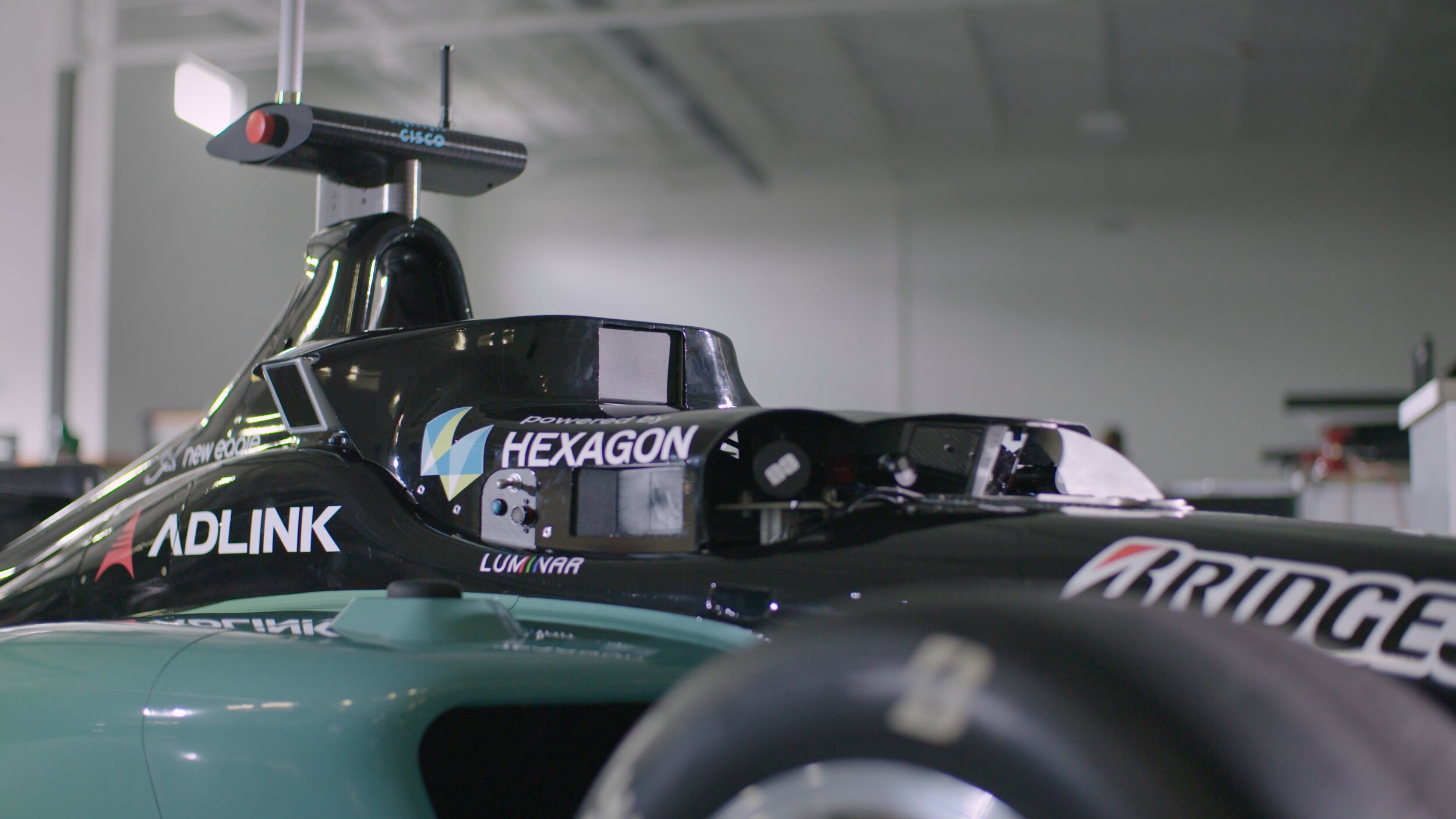
Detail of the Dallara AV-21 Prototype showing the LiDAR, Radar and Camera sensors

For the IAC, a special autonomous race car was developed, initially in 2021 by Clemson University in the Deep Orange Project, and the vehicle was presented at CES 2021. The race car is based on a Dallara IL-15 Indy Lights chassis enhanced with computation hardware, sensors and actuators to support autonomous operation on the racetrack.

The vehicle is named the "Dallara AV". The specific model introduced for the initial 2021 IAC challenge was the Dallara AV-21, a rear-wheel drive, powered by an internal combustion engine that produces 335 kW (449 hp) and has a 6-speed sequential gearbox. To perceive the external environment, the AV-21 vehicle was equipped with six monochrome cameras, four Radars, three LiDARs, and an RTK GPS. The cars are assembled, serviced and maintained by an external company.

The development of the physical vehicle was performed in parallel with the simulation challenges and race, in order to allow the teams to develop team-specific software using a simulator without the need of the hardware. The teams were required to purchase the race cars in order to take part in the first IAC race at the Indy Motor Speedway in October 2021.

By 2024, the IAC racecar specification had changed, and was now the Dallara AV-24—also known as the IAC AV-24—the next-generation autonomous vehicle platform for the IAC racing series.

The AV-24 has the same base Dallara AV chassis as the AV-21, but IAC has entirely re-engineered the compute hardware, sensors, and software system to support the autonomous racecar operation. New equipment includes six Allied Vision Mako G-319C cameras (2064 x 1544 px resolution, 12-bit color depth, 37.5 frames per second), a Luminar Iris 360-degree long-range 275 m (902 ft)) lidar system, Continental ARS 548 radar sensor with range of 300–1,500 m (980–4,920 ft), New Eagle/IAC custom drive-by-wire system (steer-by-wire, brake-by-wire including independent actuation of front and rear brakes), Marelli race control and real-time data interface, and an improved GPS interface. An AV-24 updated simulation tool was released to allow potential competitors to train and test their AI driver without having to buy a physical car and test it in the real world.

The previous AV-21 hardware/software platform had suffered from maintenance and troubleshooting issues, especially in the fragility of the wiring harnesses, with numerous teams reporting problems.
