= Advanced Technology Research Council =

Research institute in the United Arab Emirates

- Founded: May 2020; 5 years ago
- Founder: Khalifa bin Zayed Al Nahyan
- Headquarters: Abu Dhabi
- Key people: Khalifa bin Zayed Al Nahyan (Founder) Ray O. Johnson (CEO) Faisal Al Bannai (Secretary General)
- Website: https://www.atrc.ae/

The Advanced Technology Research Council (ATRC) is an Abu Dhabi government entity responsible for research and development (R&D) for technology in Abu Dhabi, the capital of the United Arab Emirates.

The current ATRC Secretary-General is Faisal Al Bannai.

== Organization ==
ATRC has three entities that manage the council's research areas:

- Technology Innovation Institute - This is the applied research technology pillar and global research and development institution.
- ASPIRE - This is the technology and business solutions pillar.
- VentureOne - This is the commercialization arm that facilitates the transition of prototypes from lab to market.

ATRC was established in May 2020 by former UAE President Khalifa bin Zayed Al Nahyan. ATRC is responsible for defining policies and procedures for R&D in Abu Dhabi

== Research Centers ==
ATRC's Technology Innovation Institute (TII) comprises 10 research centers

- Advanced Materials Research Center (AMRC)
- Autonomous Robotics Research Center (ARRC)
- Cryptography Research Center (CRC)
- AI and Digital Science Research Center (AIDRC)
- Directed Energy Research Center (DERC)
- Quantum Research Center (QRC)
- Secure Systems Research Center (SSRC)
- Propulsion and Space Research Center (PSRC)
- Renewable and Sustainable Energy Research Center (RSERC)
- Biotechnology Research Center (BRC)
