= Dallara IL-15 =

Open-wheel formula racing car chassis built by Dallara

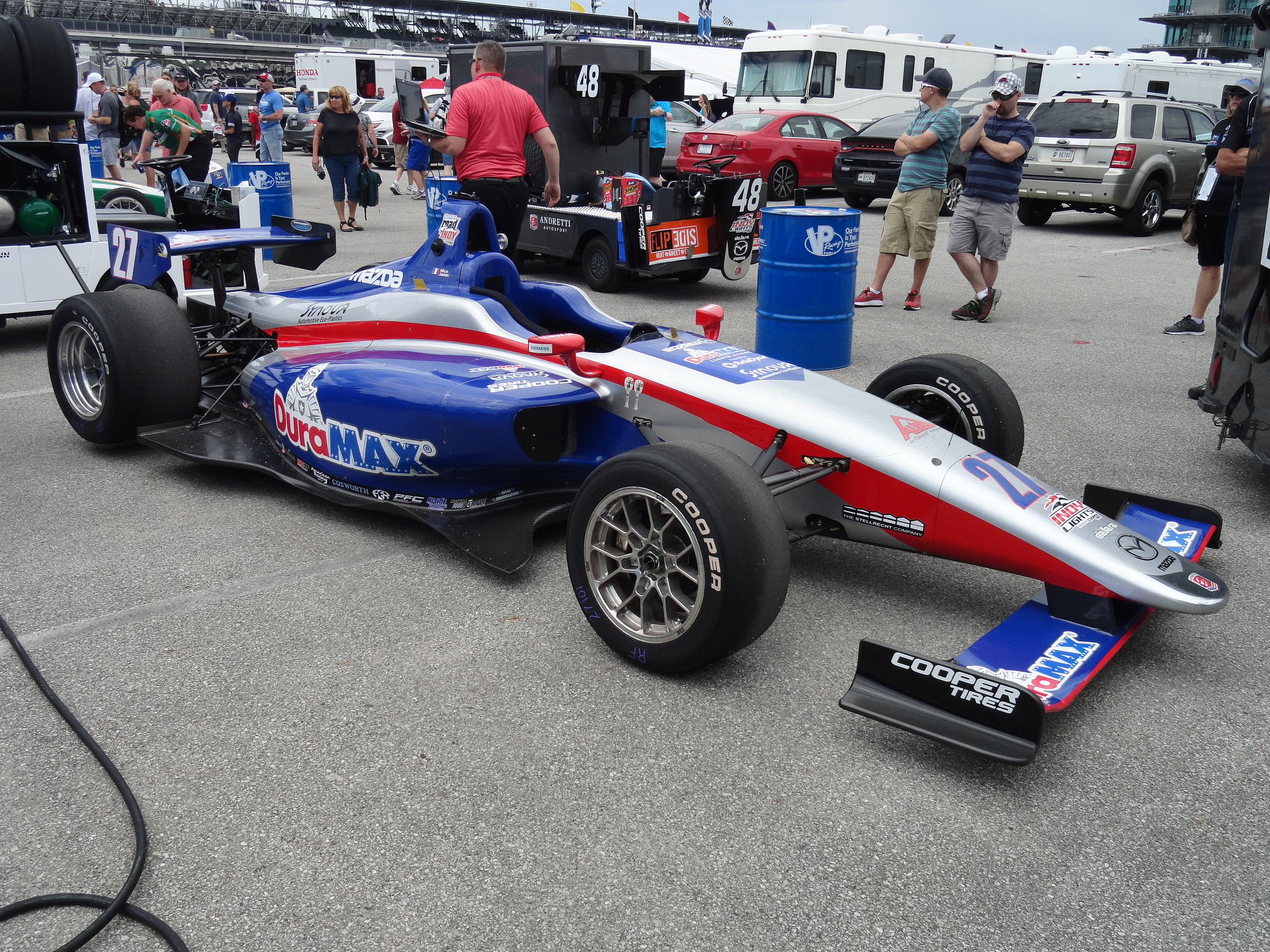
- Category: Indy NXT
- Constructor: Dallara
- Predecessor: Dallara IPS

Technical specifications
- Chassis: Carbon fiber honeycomb composite monocoque
- Length: 192 in (4,900 mm)
- Width: 76 in (1,900 mm)
- Engine: Mid-engine, longitudinally mounted, 1,998 cubic centimetres (2.0 litres; 121.9 cubic inches), Mazda-AER P63, I4, turbocharged
- Transmission: 6-speed semi-automatic sequential
- Power: 450 horsepower (340 kilowatts; 460 metric horsepower) + 50 hp (37 kW) on push-to-pass 435 pound force-feet (590 newton-metres) + 55 pound force-feet (75 newton-metres) on push-to-pass
- Weight: 1,400.0 pounds (635.0 kilograms)
- Fuel: VP Racing Fuels 102-RON unleaded gasoline
- Tyres: Cooper (2015-2022) later Firestone (2023-present)

Competition history
- Debut: 2015

The Dallara IL-15 is an open-wheel formula racing car chassis, designed, developed and built by Dallara. Since 2015, it has been the spec-chassis for the one-make Indy NXT, a feeder series for the IndyCar Series.
