= Arab Spring concurrent incidents =

The Arab Spring concurrent incidents refer to a series of protests, demonstrations, and political unrest that occurred in parallel with the major uprisings of the Arab Spring (2010–2012) across the broader Middle East and North Africa region. While the core revolutions took place in countries like Tunisia, Egypt, Libya, Yemen, Syria, and Bahrain, other nations experienced related incidents of civil unrest, calls for reform, or heightened government crackdowns. These events varied widely in scale and impact, ranging from peaceful protests to violent confrontations, and in some cases led to policy shifts or intensified repression.

== Algeria ==
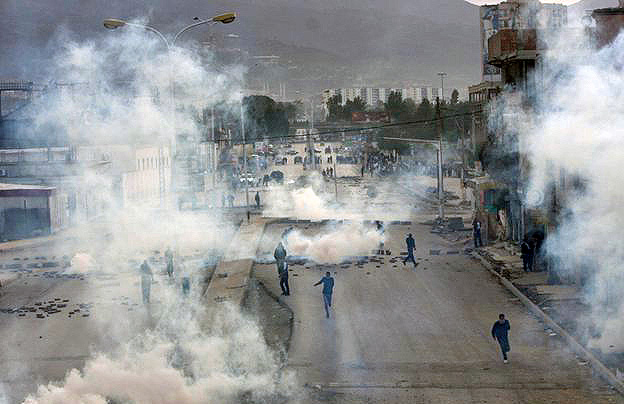
8 January 2011 protests in Algeria.

On 29 December, protests began in Algiers over the lack of housing, quickly escalating to violent confrontations with the police. At least 53 people were reported injured and another 29 arrested. From 12 to 19 January, a wave of self-immolation attempts swept the country, beginning with Mohamed Aouichia, who set himself on fire in Bordj Menaiel in protest at his family's housing. On 13 January, Mohsen Bouterfif set himself on fire after a meeting with the mayor of Boukhadra in Tebessa, who had been unable to offer Bouterfif a job and a house. Bouterfif reportedly died a few days later, and about 100 youths protested his death, resulting in the mayor's dismissal by the provincial governor. At least ten other self-immolation attempts were reported that week. On 22 January, the RCD party organised a demonstration for democracy in Algiers, and though illegal under the State of Emergency enacted in 1992, it was attended by about 300 people. The demonstration was suppressed by police, with 42 reported injuries. On 29 January, at least ten thousand people marched in the northeastern city of Béjaïa.

In an apparent bid to stave off unrest, President Abdelaziz Bouteflika announced on 3 February that the 19-year state of emergency would be lifted, a promise fulfilled on 22 February, when Algeria's cabinet adopted an order to lift the state of emergency. Bouteflika said on 15 April that he would seek revisions to the country's constitution as part of a broad push for democratic reforms.

In January 2012, protests flared up again in the southern city of Laghouat, over housing and treatment of the elderly by police. The police used tear gas to disperse the protesters.

Algeria's major Islamist parties announced a coalition ahead of parliamentary elections. A leader of the Movement of Society for Peace called for more opposition parties to join the alliance "to give the best possible chance for the Arab Spring to happen in Algeria as well".

== Israel ==
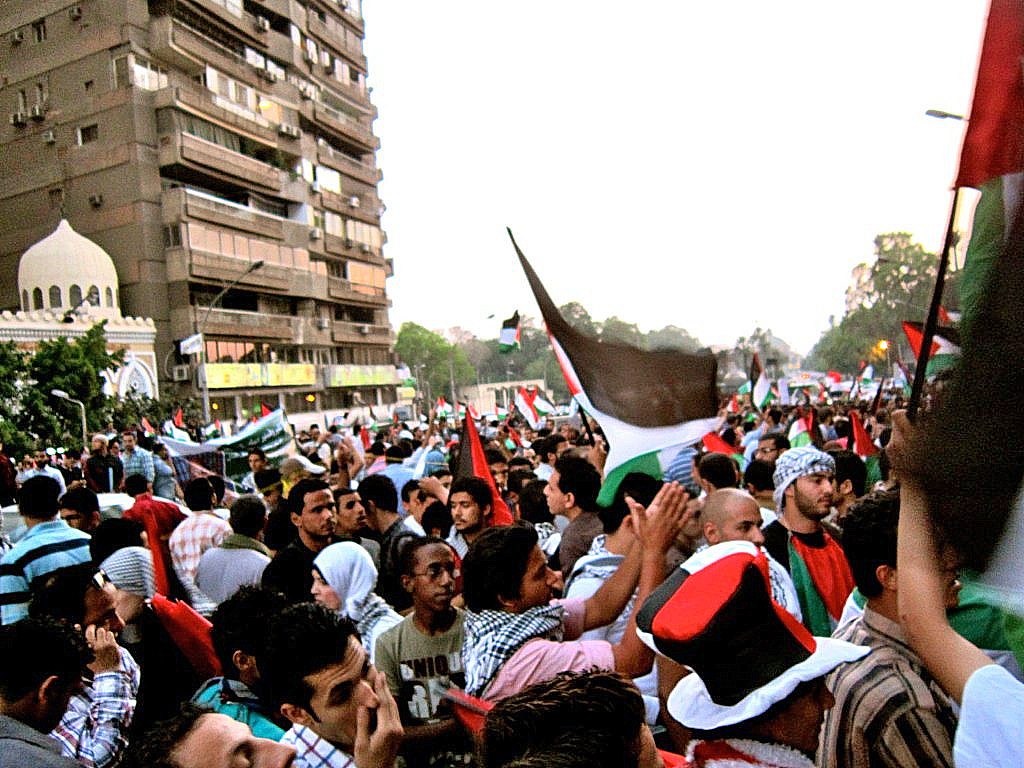
Free Palestine rally in Cairo

Palestinians used Facebook to call for mass protests throughout the region on 15 May 2011, the 63rd annual commemoration of the Palestinian exodus, locally known as Nakba Day. A page calling for a "Third Palestinian Intifada" to begin on 15 May garnered more than 350,000 "likes" before being taken down by Facebook managers at the end of March after complaints from the Israeli government that the page encouraged violence. The page called for mass marches to Palestine from Egypt, Lebanon, Syria and Jordan to commemorate the Nakba and demand the right of return for all Palestinian refugees. Palestinians from Egypt, Jordan, Lebanon, Syria, the Gaza Strip and the West Bank attempted to reach and cross the Israeli border. However, they were all stopped and 12 were killed in clashes with Israeli security forces. Lebanese security forces also made efforts, including the use of live fire according to some reports, to stop protesters from approaching the Israeli border. Almost 300 people were injured, including 13 Israeli soldiers. There were also clashes across East Jerusalem.

On 5 June 23 Syrian demonstrators were killed and over a hundred injured by Israeli troops after attempting to enter the Israeli-held part of the Golan Heights. "Anyone who tries to cross the border will be killed," Israeli soldiers warned through megaphones as people waving Palestinian flags streamed towards the frontier. When protesters tried to cut the razor wire several meters short of the frontier fence, Israeli troops opened fire. Several people were seen being carried away on stretchers. In the aftermath, thousands began a sit-in near the frontier, resulting in Syrian security forces creating a security buffer zone to prevent more demonstrators from approaching the border. Lebanese President Michel Sleiman accused Israel of genocide over the incident, UN High Commissioner on Human Rights Navanethem Pillay condemned the Israel Defense Forces' use of force against unarmed, civilian protesters, and the Syrian Social Nationalist Party called for an international response to the incident, calling it a "massacre". An Israeli military spokeswoman called the violence "an attempt to divert international attention from the bloodbath going on in Syria." Michael Weiss, a spokesperson for Just Journalism, claimed that he had received leaked Syrian state documents showing that the Syrian government organized the Nakba Day protests to draw attention away from the uprising in Syria proper. US State Department spokesman Mark Toner said the U.S. believes President Bashar al-Assad's government was actively supporting the Palestinian protests near the Israeli border.

== Djibouti ==
In Djibouti, protests began on 28 January 2011, when demonstrations began with about three hundred people protesting peacefully against President Ismail Omar Guelleh in Djibouti City, urging him to not run for another term; the protesters further asked for more liberty as well as for political and social reform. Protests soon increased, however, as thousands rallied against the president, many vowing to remain at the site until their demands were met. On 18 February, an estimated 30,000 Dijiboutians protested in central Djibouti City against the president, maintaining that the constitutional change of the previous year, which allowed him a third term, was illegal. The demonstration escalated into clashes with the police, and at least two persons were killed and many injured when police used live ammunition and teargas against the protesters. On 19 and 24 February, protest leaders were arrested and after they failed to turn up on 24 February, opposition leader Bourhan Mohammed Ali stated he feared the protests had lost momentum. The last protest was planned for 11 March, but security forces stopped the protest and detained 4 opposition leaders. No protests or planned protests have occurred since.

== Iranian Khuzestan ==
In Iranian Khuzestan, according to Saudi Al Arabiya, Lebanese Yalibnan, the Guardian, there were large scale protests, declared as "Day of Rage" by Ahvaz Arab minority, in the city of Ahvaz – capital of the Khuzestan province, and the nearby town of Hamidieh. The protests marked six years since the violent 2005 Ahvaz unrest. The protesters were "demanding more rights and humanitarian benefits", as well as independence. The Revolutionary Guard Corps used tear gas to disperse the demonstrations, while using live bullets in some neighborhoods. Al-Arabiya reported that when the protests began, the city was blockaded by Iranian security forces, who "broke up demonstrations by force" and that "15 people from Ahwaz have been killed and dozens have been wounded". The Guardian puts the casualty rate at 12 dead Arabic-speaking Sunnis, based on Shirin Ebadi's letter to the UN.

== Iraq ==
In an effort to prevent unrest, Iraqi Prime Minister Nouri al-Maliki announced that he would not run for a third term in 2014. Nevertheless, hundreds of protesters gathered in several major urban areas (notably Baghdad and Karbala) on 20 February, demanding a more effective approach to national security, to the investigation of federal corruption cases, as well as increased government involvement in making public services fair and accessible. In response, the government promised to subsidize electricity costs.

Israel's Haaretz reported that a 31-year-old man in Mosul died from self-immolation, in protest of high unemployment. Haaretz also reported a planned 'Revolution of Iraqi Rage' to be held on 25 February near the Green Zone.

On 16 February, up to 2,000 protesters took over a provincial council building in the city of Kut. The protesters demanded that the provincial governor resign because of the lack of basic services such as electricity and water. As many as three people were killed and 30 injured. On 24 February, Hawijah, Mosul, and Baghdad featured violent protests.

During July and August 2015, protests flared in Baghdad, Basra, and other Iraqi cities demanding reforms to improve government performance, reduce sectarianism, and fight corruption. In response, Prime Minister Haider al-Abadi and the Iraqi parliament approved reforms reducing the size of the cabinet, eliminating various governmental positions, merging ministries, and removing sectarian quotas in political appointments. These protests had occurred during the Iraqi civil war and the military intervention against ISIL, which were mostly fought in northern Iraq.

== Jordan ==
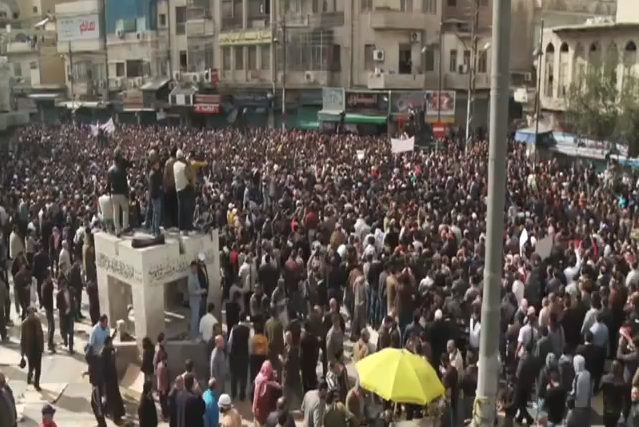
Mass protest in Amman over price hikes

On 14 January, protests commenced in the capital Amman, as well as at Ma'an, Al Karak, Salt, Irbid, and other settlements. The protests, led by trade unionists and leftist parties, occurred after Friday prayers, and called for the government of Prime Minister Samir Rifai to step down. The Muslim Brotherhood and 14 trade unions said that they would hold a sit-down protest outside parliament the next day to "denounce government economic policies". Following the protest, the government reversed a rise in fuel prices, but 5,000 protested on 21 January in Amman despite this effort to alleviate Jordan's economic misery.

On 1 February, the Royal Palace announced that King Abdullah had dismissed the government on account of the street protests, and had asked Marouf al-Bakhit, a former army general, to form a new Cabinet. King Abdullah charged Bakhit to "take quick, concrete and practical steps to launch a genuine political reform process". The monarch added that the reforms should put Jordan on the path "to strengthen democracy", and provide Jordanians with the "dignified life they deserve". This move did not end protests, however, which peaked with a rally of between 6,000 and 10,000 Jordanians on 25 February. A protest camp led by students calling for democratic reforms was established on 24 March in Gamal Abdel Nasser Circle in downtown Amman, but at least one person was killed and over 100 injured the next day after pro-government vigilantes clashed with the protesters in the camp, forcing police to intervene. These clashes and belated police interventions have become a hallmark of the Jordanian protests, with a major rally in central Amman planned for 15 July being derailed by belligerent regime supporters.

Under pressure from street demonstrations, Parliament called for the ouster of the Bakhit government. King Abdullah duly sacked Bakhit and his cabinet and named Awn Shawkat Al-Khasawneh to head the new government on 17 October. As the protests continued well into 2012, Al-Khasawneh resigned, and the King appointed Fayez al-Tarawneh as the new Prime Minister.

== Kuwait ==
Protests by stateless bedoon (distinct from Bedouins) began in January and February, concurrent with many protests in the region. By June, protests grew in size from dozens to hundreds.

Thousands protested in September, and in October, oil workers went on strike. Protests continued into October, with the largest demonstrations since the start of the unrest early in the year. In response, Prime Minister Nasser Mohammed Al-Ahmed Al-Sabah said the protests were "going too far" and threatened a security crackdown.

Late on 16 November, protesters occupied the National Assembly of Kuwait for several minutes and rallied in nearby Al-Erada Square. Emir Sabah Al-Ahmad Al-Jaber Al-Sabah called the brief occupation "an unprecedented step on the path to anarchy and lawlessness".

The largest political protest in Kuwaiti history was scheduled for 28 November to pressure the prime minister to resign, but he and his cabinet submitted their resignation to the emir hours ahead of it. Late November, the emir selected Defense Minister Sheik Jaber Al Hamad Al Sabah as the new prime minister, replacing the long-serving Sheik Nasser Al Mohammad Al Sabah, who had survived several no-confidence votes in parliament and was the target of opposition groups calling for his dismissal.

== Lebanon ==
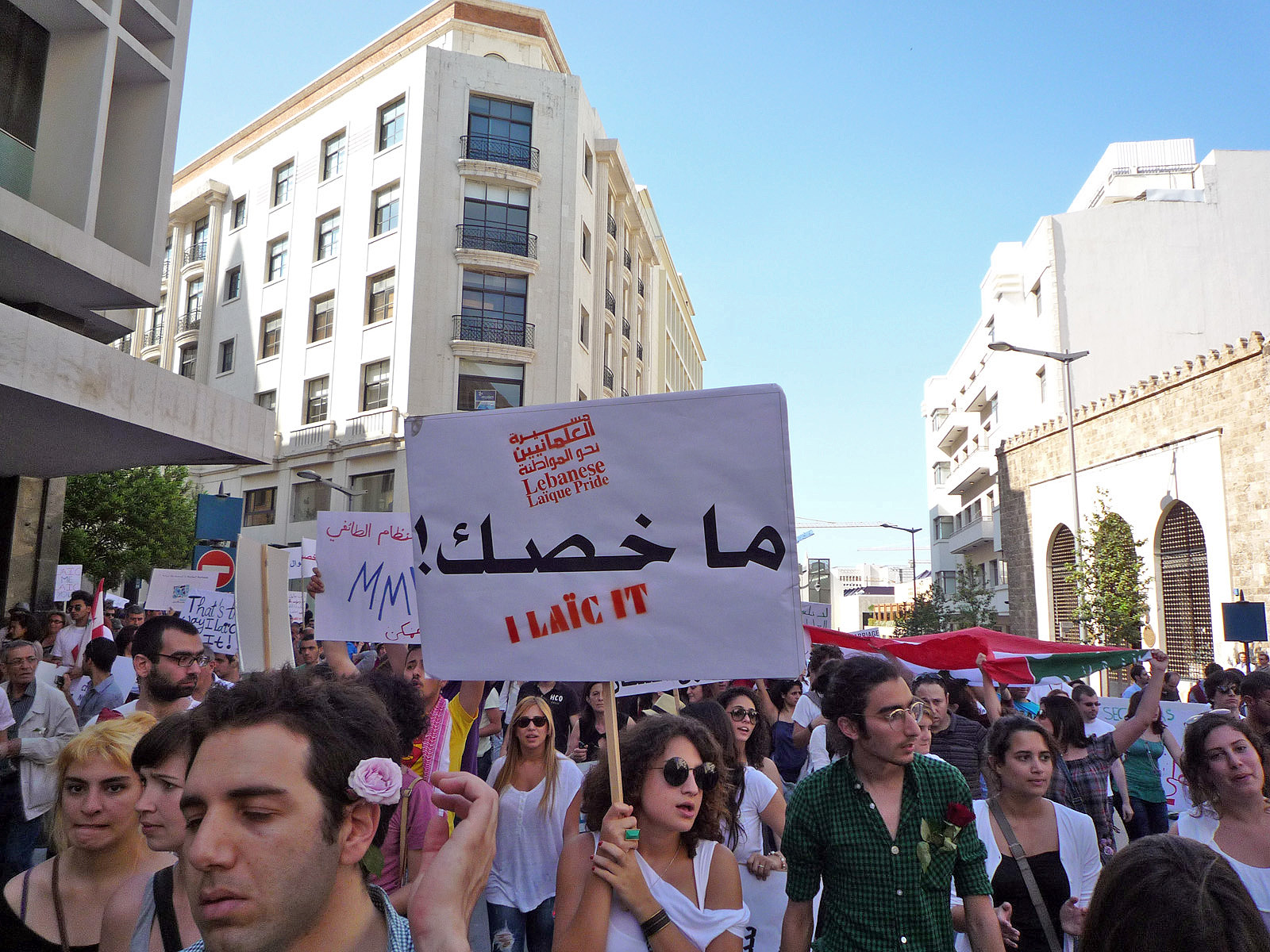
A "Laïque Pride" rally in Beirut Central District, Lebanon

In 2011, hundreds of protesters rallied in Beirut on 27 February in a march referred to as the "Laïque Pride", calling for reform of the country's confessional political system. At the same time, a peaceful sit-in took place in Saida. On 13 March, tens of thousands of supporters of the 14 March Alliance called for the disarmament of Hezbollah in Beirut, rejecting the supremacy of Hezbollah's weapons over political life. They also showed support for the U.N.-backed Special Tribunal for Lebanon (STL) after the fall of the Hariri government and the creation of the Mikati government.

The Syrian uprising, and the resulting conflict, has also leaked over the border into Lebanon. The 2012 conflict in Lebanon was related to violent sectarian clashes between pro-Assad, who were mostly Alawite militias, and anti-Assad, who were largely Sunni Lebanese armed militants throughout Lebanon. In May 2012, the conflict expanded across most of Lebanon, linked to the revolt in neighboring Syria, escalating from previous sectarian clashes in Tripoli, northern Lebanon in June 2011 and February 2012. Since May 2012, dozens died in the clashes and hundreds were wounded.

== Mauritania ==
In Mauritania, Yacoub Ould Dahoud, a protester, burned himself near the Presidential Palace on 17 January, in opposition to the policies of the President Mohamed Ould Abdel Aziz, who has been in office since 2009. The following week, hundreds of people took to the streets of Nouakchott, the capital. The mayor of the city of Aoujeft, Mohamed El Moctar Ould Ehmeyen Amar, resigned from the ruling party to politically support what he called "the just cause of youngsters". In addition to Nouakchott, cities such as Atar, Zouerate, and Aleg also organised sporadic protests. Despite minor economic concessions by the authorities, on 25 April protesters again took to the streets to call for the resignation of the Prime Minister, Moulaye Ould Mohamed Laghdaf.

== Morocco ==
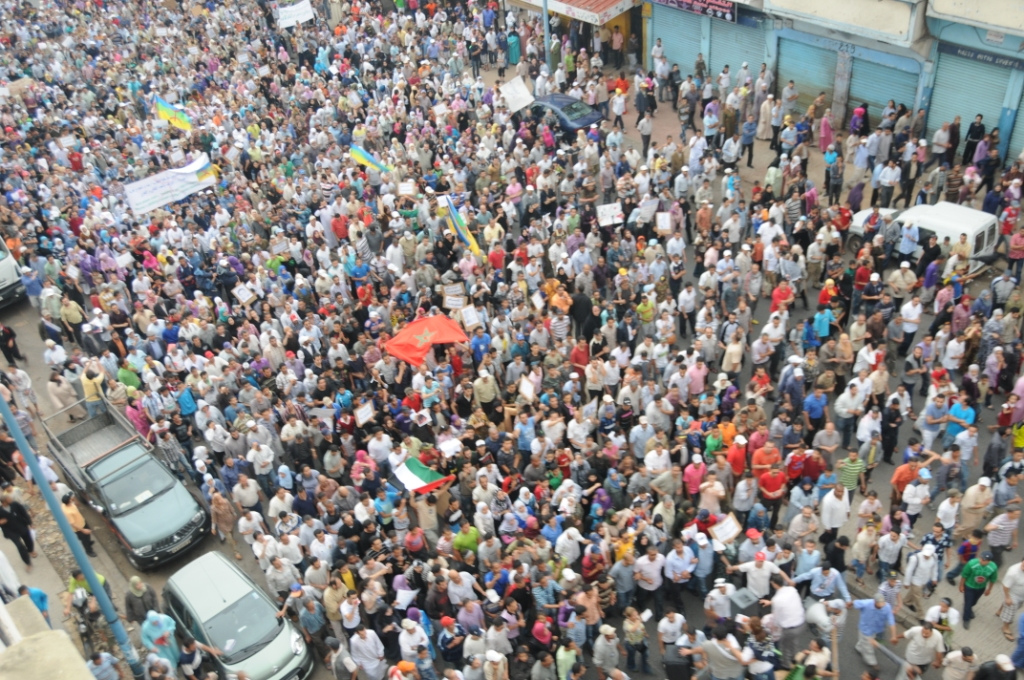
Thousands of demonstrators gathered in Casablanca

In early February 2011, protests were held in Rabat, Fes and Tangier in solidarity with the Egyptian revolution. Subsequently, a day of protest in favour of Moroccan constitutional reform and social justice was planned for 20 February and advertised on social networking sites. Among the demands of the organisers was that the constitutional role of the king should be "reduced to its natural size". The interior minister Taib Cherkaoui affirmed the right of the protests to take place. On 20 February, around 37,000 people participated in demonstrations across Morocco, according to government sources. Some protests were marred by violence and damage to property. In Al Hoceima, five people died after protesters set fire to a bank. On 26 February, a further protest was held in Casablanca.

On 9 March, in a live televised address, King Mohammed announced that he would begin a comprehensive constitutional reform aimed at improving democracy and the rule of law. He promised to form a commission to work on constitutional revisions, which would make proposals to him by June, after which a referendum would be held on the draft constitution.

On 20 March, a further protest was held in Casablanca to mark the end of the first month since the original 20 February demonstrations and to maintain pressure for reform. Protesters, numbering 20,000, demanded the resignation of a number of senior politicians, including the Prime Minister, Abbas El Fassi, who they regarded as corrupt. On the same day, around 6,000 people demonstrated in Rabat.

In June, a referendum was held on changes to the constitution, which became law on 13 September. Some protesters felt that the reforms did not go far enough. On 18 September, 3,000 people demonstrated in Casablanca and 2,000 in Tangier, demanding an end to the King's roles as head of the army and of religious affairs. In October, around 50 imams protested in Rabat against state control of their activities.

Elections were held on the basis of the new constitution in November 2011, with electoral lists reserved for young and female candidates and with the post of Prime Minister, previously an appointment of the King, being decided by the outcome of the vote.

== Oman ==
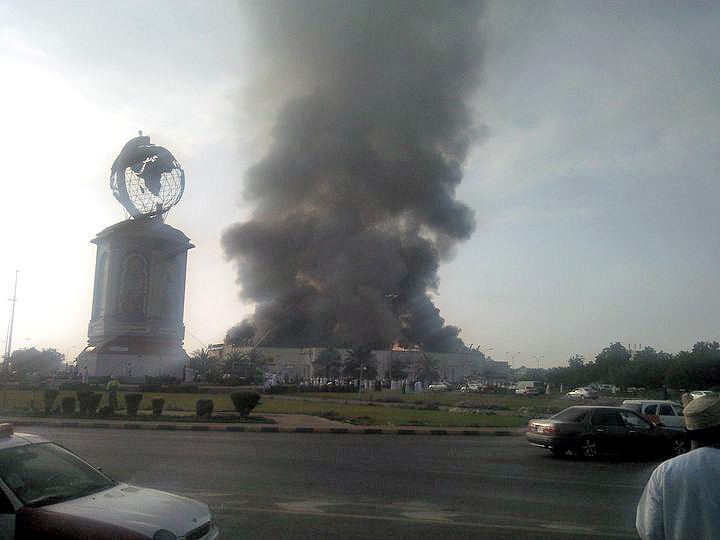
Protesters set ablaze Lulu Hypermarket in Sohar, Oman on 28 February 2011

In the Gulf country of Oman, 200 protesters marched on 17 January 2011, demanding salary increases and a lower cost of living. The protest shocked some journalists, who generally view Oman as a 'politically stable and sleepy country'. Renewed peaceful protests occurred on 18 February, with 350 protesters demanding an end to corruption and better distribution of oil revenue. Some protesters also carried signs with slogans of support for the Sultan.

On 26 February, protesters in Sohar called for more jobs. On the following day, tensions escalated with protesters burning shops and cars. The police responded using tear gas to contain and disperse the crowds of protesters. Demonstrations also spread to the region of Salalah, where protesters had reportedly been camping outside the provincial governor's house since 25 February. In Sohar, witnesses claimed that two protesters were killed when police fired rubber bullets to disperse the crowds. Witnesses further reported that protesters burnt a police station as well as the Wali's house (where the representative of the Sultan to Sohar stays). The Omani protesters insisted that they were not challenging the rule of Sultan Qaboos, who has been in power since 1970, but were merely calling for jobs and reform. The protesters even apologized to the Sultan for allowing violence rattle the city of Sohar on 28 February 2011.

The Sultan continued with his reform campaign by dissolving the Ministry of National Economy, setting up a state audit committee, granting student and unemployment benefits, dismissing scores of ministers, and reshuffling his cabinet three times. In addition, nearly 50,000 jobs are being created in the public sector, including 10,000 new jobs in the Royal Oman Police. The Omani Ministry of Manpower has furthermore directed various companies (both private and public) to formulate their own employment plans. The Royal Army of Oman has also initiated employment drives by publishing recruitment advertisements in newspapers, etc. The government's efforts largely placated protesters, and Oman has not seen significant demonstrations since May 2011, when increasingly violent protests in Salalah were subdued.

== Palestine ==
In the West Bank, the Palestinian National Authority prevented demonstrations in support of protesters in Tunisia and Egypt. On 3 February, Palestinian police dispersed an anti-Mubarak demonstration in downtown Ramallah, detaining four people, confiscating a cameraman's footage, and reportedly beating protesters. A smaller pro-Mubarak demonstration was permitted to take place in the same area and was guarded by police.

On 1 February 2011, the Palestinian Authority announced that it would hold municipal elections in July. The Israeli newspaper Haaretz reported that this announcement was a reaction to the anti-government protests in Egypt. The elections were postponed to 22 October 2011, then suspended indefinitely due to an internal division within the Palestinian Authority over candidates for many of the municipalities and councils, and fears that Hamas supporters would back Palestinian Authority opponents. On 14 February 2011, amid pan-Arab calls for reform, Palestinian Authority Prime Minister Salam Fayyad submitted his resignation along with that of his cabinet to President Mahmoud Abbas. After consultations with other factions, institutions, and civil society groups, Abbas asked him to form a new government. The reshuffle had long been demanded by Fayyad as well as members of Abbas's Fatah faction.

On early September 2012, Palestinian Authority was swept by wide-scale social protests, demanding lower prices and the resignation of Prime Minister Salam Fayyad.

On 15 October in the Gaza Strip, an anti-Assad protest expressing solidarity with Palestinian refugees in Syria affected by the unrest there took place in the Gaza Strip, and was attended by 150 people. Hamas police forces dispersed the demonstration, claiming that it was held without a permit.

== Saudi Arabia ==
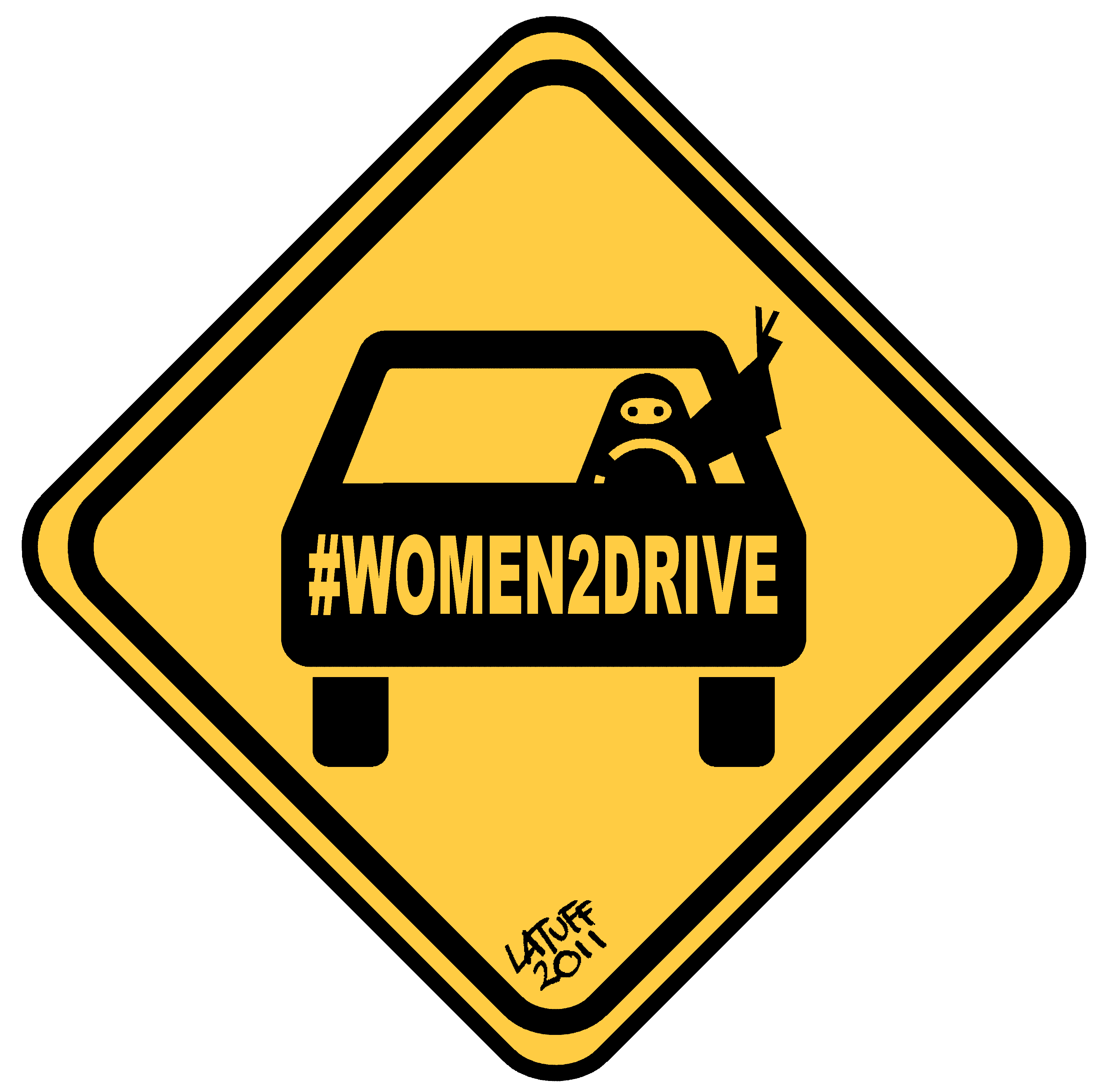
Poster for the Saudi Arabia's women to drive movement, artwork by Carlos Latuff.

Protests started with a 65-year-old man's self-immolation in Samtah, Jizan on 21 January and protests of a few hundred people in late January in Jeddah and several times throughout February and early March in the cities of Qatif, al-Awamiyah, Riyadh, and Hofuf. One of the main online organisers of a planned 11 March "Day of Rage", Faisal Ahmed Abdul-Ahad (or Abdul-Ahadwas), was alleged to have been killed by Saudi security forces on 2 March, by which time one of the Facebook groups discussing the plans had over 26,000 members.

Small protests over labor rights took place in April 2011 in front of government ministry buildings in Riyadh, Ta'if and Tabuk. Protests, made up mainly of Shia protestors, occurred in Qatif and smaller cities in the Eastern Province such as al-Awamiyah, and Hofuf grew stronger in April and May, continuing through 2011. The protestors called for the release of prisoners, for the Peninsula Shield Force to be withdrawn from Bahrain, for equal representation in key offices and for reforms in political positions, as they feel marginalised. Four protestors were killed by Saudi authorities in late November protests and funerals. The protests continued into early 2012 and Issam Mohamed Abu Abdallah was shot dead by security forces in al-Awamiyah on 12 or 13 January, leading to a 70,000 strong funeral and several days of protests with slogans chanted against the House of Saud and Minister of Interior, Nayef, Crown Prince of Saudi Arabia.

Women organised a Facebook women's suffrage campaign called "Baladi", stating that Saudi Arabian law gives women electoral rights. In April 2011, women in Jeddah, Riyadh and Dammam tried to register as electors for the 29 September municipal elections despite officials stating that women could not participate. In May and June, Manal al-Sharif and other women organised a women's right-to-drive campaign, with the main action to take place on 17 June. Al-Sharif drove a car in May and was detained on 22 May and from 23‒30 May. From 17 June to late June, about seventy cases of women driving were documented. In late September, Shaima Jastania was sentenced to 10 lashes for driving in Jeddah, shortly after King Abdullah announced women's participation in the 2015 municipal elections and eligibility as Consultative Assembly members; King Abdullah overturned the sentence.

== Sudan ==
On 30 January 2011, protests took place in Khartoum and Al-Ubayyid. In Khartoum, police clashed with demonstrators in the town centre and at least two universities. Demonstrators had organized on online social networking sites since the Tunisian protests the month before. Hussein Khogali, editor in chief of the Al-Watan newspaper stated that his daughter had been arrested for organizing the protest via Facebook and opposition leader Mubarak al-Fadil's two sons were arrested while on their way to the main protest. Pro-government newspapers had warned that protests would cause chaos. Some protesters called for President Omar al-Bashir to step down. Activists said that dozens of people had been arrested. The protests came on the same day the preliminary results for an independence referendum indicated some 99% of South Sudanese voted to secede. One student died in hospital the same night from injuries received in the clashes. Students threw rocks at police officers while chanting "No to high prices, no to corruption" and "Tunisia, Egypt, Sudan together as one." Police officers arrested five and put down the protest.

In the Al-Ubayyid (el-Obeid) 30 January demonstration, about 500 people protested "against the government and demanding change" in the market. Police broke up the demonstration using tear gas. On 1 February 2011, about 200 students demonstrated in front of Al-Neelain University in Khartoum. Police stopped the demonstration. Further protests, scheduled for 21 March, were violently suppressed as they were beginning. On 1 November, hundreds of protesters took to the streets in the eastern town of Kassala.

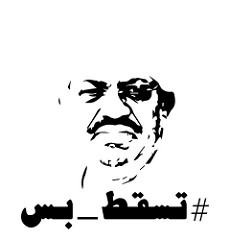
"Tasgut bas" sketch

Anti-austerity protests erupted on 16 June 2012, when the student-led activists from Khartoum University took to the streets to protest against the planned austerity measures and high prices announced by the government on the latter day. The protest movement later expands beyond the core of student activists and spread across the capital Khartoum along with other cities, with some protesters escalate its demand by calling for overthrow of the government.

Sudanese protests (2018–19) began in Sudan on 19 December 2018 when the National Congress Party headquarters in Atbara was burned down. Fuel and bread costs, high inflation, and a shortage of cash in the economy have contributed to public discontent and to calls for President Omar al-Bashir to step down.[4][5] The protesters have been met with tear gas and live ammunition,[6] causing dozens of deaths and injuries and prompting international criticism. "Just fall – that is all" (تسقط – بس)[7] is one of the most famous slogans from the Sudanese protests.

== United Arab Emirates ==
In the United Arab Emirates, a group of intellectuals petitioned their ruler for comprehensive reform of the Federal National Council, including demands for universal suffrage. About 160 people signed the petition, many of whom were academics and former members of the FNC. On 12 April, Ahmed Mansoor, a prominent blogger and pro-democracy activist, was charged with possession of alcohol. According to his lawyer, two other men, a blogger and a political commentator, were detained a few days earlier, a charge denied by the police. In May, the government started expanding its network of surveillance cameras, as a preventive measure against revolts. In June, Mansoor and four other reform activists, including an economics professor, Nasser bin Gaith, pleaded not guilty to insulting the ruling family, endangering national security and inciting people to protest, after being charged. On 13 November they began a hunger strike, while on 27 November they were sentenced, Ahmed Mansoor receiving three years in prison, while the others being sentenced to two-year jail terms, only to be pardoned the following day. Another activist, Ahmed Abdul Khaleq was arrested and had his right to remain in the UAE revoked. At the same time, he was deported to Thailand. In July 2013, a trial of 94 Islamists accused of a coup plot ended with 68 of the accused being jailed for at least 7 years, 8 of them convicted in absentia for 15 years and 26 of the defendants being acquitted.

== Western Sahara ==
In Western Sahara, young Sahrawis held a series of minor demonstrations to protest labour discrimination, lack of jobs, looting of resources, and human rights abuses. Although protests from February 2011 onward were related to a series of Sahrawi demonstrations outside El Aaiun that originated in October 2010 and died down the following month, protesters cited inspiration from the events in other parts of the region. Noam Chomsky viewed the October protests as the starting point from which 'the current wave of protests actually began'.
