= Ahmed Abdul Khaleq =

Bedoun activist (born c. 1977)

- Born: c. 1977 (age 48–49); Dubai, United Arab Emirates
- Citizenship: Comoros (he was previously Bedoon)
- Occupations: Activist and blogger
- Known for: member of the UAE Five

Ahmed Abdul Khaleq (Arabic: أحمد عبد الخالق; born c. 1977) is a blogger and activist of the stateless Bedoon minority who formerly resided in Ajman in the United Arab Emirates. From April to November 2011, he was imprisoned as one of the UAE Five on charges of insulting United Arab Emirates President Khalifa bin Zayed Al Nahyan, Vice President Mohammed bin Rashid Al Maktoum, and Crown Prince of Abu Dhabi Mohammed bin Zayed Al Nahyan. Amnesty International designated him a prisoner of conscience, and he was released following a presidential pardon. In May 2012, he was rearrested and given a choice between indefinite detention or exile. On 16 July, he left the country for Thailand.

== The UAE Five ==
Inspired by the growing momentum of the pro-democracy Arab Spring, Emirati activists began to be more vocal in their opposition to the UAE government in early 2011. Bin Ghaith, an "outspoken economics professor", was arrested on 11 April for his call for "democratic and economic reforms". Mansoor, an engineer, blogger, and member of Human Rights Watch, was arrested the same day for signing a petition in favor of an elected parliament, and Dalk, al-Khamis, and Khaleq were detained for their online activities before the end of the month. Following their arrests, UAE government-controlled media reported that the five were "religious extremists" and Iranian foreign agents.

Their arrests received immediate international attention, with continuing coverage in the BBC News, The New York Times, and various other media. Amnesty International designated the five prisoners of conscience and called for their immediate and unconditional release, recruiting comedians and writers to lobby for their cause at the 2011 Edinburgh Festival. The organization also coined the name "The UAE Five" to refer to the men, which was later adopted by some media sources. Human Rights Watch condemned the trial as "an attack on free expression", and Front Line Defenders, the Index on Censorship, and the Arabic Network For Human Rights Information also called for the men's release. Because of his academic background, bin Ghaith's trial was also protested by the Committee for Human Rights of the US National Academy of Sciences, Scholars at Risk, and the Committee of Concerned Scientists.

== Trial, conviction, and pardon ==
Their trial began on 14 June 2011 in Abu Dhabi. A Human Rights Watch spokesman criticized the "public relations campaign" of the UAE government against the defendants, stating that dozens of pro-government demonstrators were attending the trial to protest the five prisoners. The government charged the prisoners with violating article 176 of the UAE Penal Code, which criminalizes insults to the nation's leadership; the prosecutor's case focused on their posts to an online pro-democracy forum, which had by then been shut down and replaced with a travel service. On 18 July, the UAE Five pleaded not guilty. Amnesty International later condemned their trial as "fundamentally unfair" and "marred with irregularities", stating that the defendants had been "denied any meaningful opportunity to challenge the charges and the evidence against them". Human Rights Watch also described the trial as "grossly unfair".

On 3 October, the UAE Five refused to attend a session of their trial, demanding that the hearings be opened to the public and that they be allowed to question witnesses. On 13 November, with the trial still in progress, the five began a hunger strike to protest their continued detention; Human Rights Watch reported that the five were in poor health. On 27 November, the panel of four judges sentenced bin Ghaith, Dalk, al-Khamis, and Khaleq to two years' imprisonment, and Mansoor to three years. Following the announcement of the verdict, a pro-government protester reportedly assaulted a relative of one of the defendants despite the heavy security presence.

The following day, however, the five received a presidential pardon and were released. The office of President Khalifa declined to comment to reporters on the reason for the pardon. Bin Ghaith told reporters that he was glad to be free, but that he felt that the trial had been "a sad moment for our homeland, a beginning of a police state that has tarnished the image of the UAE forever".

== May 2012 arrest and deportation ==
As a member of the Bedoon people, Khaleq had no UAE citizenship and was essentially stateless, but was granted a Comorian passport on 21 May 2012. The following day, he was arrested by authorities for his alleged ties to al-Islah, a political organization that is labeled as a terrorist organization in the UAE. According to Human Rights Watch and Amnesty International, authorities told Khaleq that he must choose between permanent expulsion from the UAE to a limited number of countries or indefinite detention. Khaleq opted to leave for Thailand, departing for Bangkok on 16 July. The UAE revoked his status to reside in the country.

Human Rights Watch criticized the deportation, calling the action an "unlawful expulsion motivated by the government's desire to stifle dissent". Amnesty International issued a statement that "Ahmed Abdul Khaleq should never have been forced to leave the country and this event sets alarm bells ringing regarding the fate of others held in the UAE in connection with alleged plots against state security".
