= UAE Five =

Emirati activists

The United Arab Emirates Five (Arabic: الإمارات خمسة, romanized: al-Imārāt Khamsat) are five activists who were arrested in April 2011 on charges of breaking United Arab Emirates law of defamation by insulting heads of state, namely UAE president Khalifa bin Zayed Al Nahyan, vice president Mohammed bin Rashid Al Maktoum, and Abu Dhabi crown prince Mohammed bin Zayed Al Nahyan, through running a website that expressed anti-government views.

The five arrested activists were:

- Nasser bin Ghaith; an Emirati economist and lecturer at the Abu Dhabi branch of the Paris-Sorbonne University.
- Ahmed Mansoor; an Emirati engineer, blogger and human rights activist.
- Fahad Salim Dalk; an Emirati online activist.
- Hassan Ali al-Khamis; an Emirati online activist.
- Ahmed Abdul Khaleq; a Bedoon online activist.

On 27 November 2011, bin Ghaith, Dalk, al-Khamis, and Khaleq were sentenced to two years' imprisonment, and Mansoor to three years of imprisonment for being the main architect and mastermind of the website. However, the following day, the five received a presidential pardon from Sheikh Khalifa bin Zayed and were released.

== Arrests ==
Inspired by the growing momentum of the pro-democracy Arab Spring, Emirati activists began to be more vocal in their opposition to the UAE government in early 2011. Bin Ghaith, an "outspoken economics professor", was arrested on 11 April for his call for "democratic and economic reforms". Mansoor, an engineer, blogger, and member of Human Rights Watch, was arrested the same day for signing a petition in favor of an elected parliament, and Dalk, al-Khamis, and Khaleq were detained for their online activities before the end of the month. Following their arrests, UAE government-controlled media reported that the five were "religious extremists" and Iranian foreign agents.

Their arrests received immediate international attention, with continuing coverage in the BBC News, The New York Times, and various other media. Amnesty International designated the five prisoners of conscience and called for their immediate and unconditional release, recruiting comedians and writers to lobby for their cause at the 2011 Edinburgh Festival. The organization also coined the name "The UAE Five" to refer to the men, which was later adopted by some media sources. Human Rights Watch condemned the trial as "an attack on free expression", and Front Line Defenders, the Index on Censorship, and the Arabic Network for Human Rights Information also called for the men's release. Because of his academic background, bin Ghaith's trial was also protested by the Committee for Human Rights of the US National Academy of Sciences, Scholars at Risk, and the Committee of Concerned Scientists.

== Trial, conviction, and pardon ==
Their trial began on 14 June 2011 in Abu Dhabi. A Human Rights Watch spokesman criticized the "public relations campaign" of the UAE government against the defendants, stating that dozens of pro-government demonstrators were attending the trial to protest the five prisoners. The government charged the prisoners with violating article 176 of the UAE Penal Code, which criminalizes insults to the nation's leadership; the prosecutor's case focused on their posts to an online pro-democracy forum, which had by then been shut down and replaced with a travel service. On 18 July, the UAE Five pleaded not guilty. Amnesty International later condemned their trial as "fundamentally unfair" and "marred with irregularities", stating that the defendants had been "denied any meaningful opportunity to challenge the charges and the evidence against them". Human Rights Watch also described the trial as "grossly unfair".

On 3 October, the UAE Five refused to attend a session of their trial, demanding that the hearings be opened to the public and that they be allowed to question witnesses. On 13 November, with the trial still in progress, the five began a hunger strike to protest their continued detention; Human Rights Watch reported that the five were in poor health. On 27 November, the panel of four judges sentenced bin Ghaith, Dalk, al-Khamis, and Khaleq to two years' imprisonment, and Mansoor to three years. Following the announcement of the verdict, a pro-government protester reportedly assaulted a relative of one of the defendants despite the heavy security presence.

The following day, however, the five received a presidential pardon and were released. The office of President Khalifa declined to comment to reporters on the reason for the pardon. Bin Ghaith told reporters that he was glad to be free, but that he felt that the trial had been "a sad moment for our homeland, a beginning of a police state that has tarnished the image of the UAE forever".

Nasser bin Ghaith was rearrested in March 2017 following his comments on Twitter regarding his previous arrest. His charges included “insulting the UAE”. The Amnesty International reported that he was not able to prepare a proper defence as his access to a lawyer was restricted by the UAE authorities. He has been on a hunger strike since 7 October 2018 and has become too weak to even stand, with initial loss of eyesight. Till date there has been no response from the Emirati authorities over his release.

== Subsequent arrests ==
=== Ahmed Mansoor Al Shehhi ===
Ahmed Mansoor was arrested again on March 19, 2017, at his Ajman home, on charges of publishing false information, inciting hatred, and defaming the UAE online and "seeking to damage the relationship of the UAE with its neighbors". He was also accused of conspiring with a terrorist organization but was found innocent of that charge. He was subsequently charged with 10 years in prison and 1,000,000 Emirati Dirham (approximately US$270,000) fine. Amnesty International criticized the United Arab Emirates for Mansoor's verdict and called the charge a "devastating blow to freedom of expression in the country" and called for the unconditional release of Mansoor.

Mansoor received the Martin Ennals Award for Human Rights Defenders in 2015 prior to his imprisonment.

Following Mansoor's deteriorating health conditions and massive weight loss due to his month-long hunger strike, the Human Rights Watch demanded his immediate release in April 2019 and described his sentence of 10 years in jail as an "unfair trial".

In May 2019, UN human rights experts said Mansoor's condition in the UAE prison and prolonged solitary confinement might constitute torture. They said they were “gravely concerned” for Mansoor's condition in the prison and urged the UAE authorities to provide him with adequate medical support or release him.

=== Ahmed Abdul Khaleq ===
Ahmed Abdul Khaleq was again arrested by authorities for his alleged ties to al-Islah in May 2012, a political organization with roots in the Muslim Brotherhood and is listed as a terrorist organization in the UAE. Since Khaleq was not an Emirati citizen (previously a bedoon and holds a Comorian passport), he was presented with the option of being deported or conviction and imprisonment. Khaleq opted to leave for Thailand, departing for Bangkok on 16 July 2012.

Human Rights Watch criticized the arrest, calling the action an "unlawful expulsion" motivated by the government's desire to stifle dissent.

=== Nasser bin Ghaith ===
Nasser bin Ghaith was arrested on 18 August 2015, four days after criticising the Egyptian government on Twitter; he was also accused of having ties with al-Islah and the Ummah Party, which had been classified as terrorist organisations in the UAE in 2014. Subsequent charges were also raised that he had published material online with "sarcastic intent" to "damage the reputation" of the Emirati government. In May 2016, he was transferred to Al-Sadr prison, where he was placed in solitary confinement; his whereabouts during the period between his arrest and the transfer were unknown to his family. During his detention, it was reported that bin Ghaith was subjected to ill treatment and torture.

Bin Ghaith's trial officially began on 4 April 2016, though Human Rights Watch reported that he did not have access to legal representation until the second hearing on 2 May. In December 2016, the judge referred the case to the Federal Appeal Court, delaying the trial from commencing properly until 21 January 2017. Bin Ghaith was subsequently sentenced to 10 years in prison.

In January 2014, bin Ghaith was among 84 people arrested on charges of "establishing and managing a clandestine terrorist organisation in the UAE known as the 'Justice and Dignity Committee'". On 10 July 2024, the Abu Dhabi Federal Appeals Court sentenced bin Ghaith to life in prison.
