= Disappearance of the Al-Suwaidi sisters =

In February 2015, three sisters from the United Arab Emirates, Asma, Mariam, and Alyaziyah Khalifa al-Suwaidi were detained incommunicado for nearly two weeks after their arrest by Emirati authorities. The sisters were campaigning for the release of their brother who was convicted for being part of Al Islah, which is an organization labeled as a terrorist organization in the UAE. According to Amnesty International, the three women are thought to have had no access to legal representation or their family.

According to news reports, one of the sisters had written using an account in Twitter "I miss my brother" in reference to their brother, Issa al-Suwaidi, one of 69 people that received a 10-year prison sentence in 2013 after being convicted of having links to al-Islah, an Islamist group accused by the UAE government of conspiring to overthrow it. The 69 convicted people were part of the 'UAE 94' trial of activists that had been held in detention for their alleged attempt in 2013 to recruit military officers to overthrow the Emirati government and induce a coup. According to Amnesty International, several cases when relatives of UAE 94 prisoners were “harassed, intimidated or arrested after criticizing proceedings or publicizing allegations of torture in detention on Twitter.” Amnesty said that the sisters were "at risk of torture or other ill-treatment" and a spokesperson said that the sisters should be "...immediately and unconditionally released, like all others detained solely for peaceful expression."

The three sisters were summoned to a police station in Abu Dhabi for questioning, and their mother received a call from a government security official the next day telling her that her daughters were fine, but no further information was provided. The UAE government classifies al-Islah as an offshoot of the Egyptian Muslim Brotherhood, and it has been classified as a terrorist organisation by the Emirati authorities.

The UK-based Emirates Centre for Human Rights condemned the enforced detention, calling it "arbitrary" and "a violation of Emirati traditions and law".

== Release ==
On May 15, 2015, all three Suwaidi sisters were reportedly released and were dropped off at their family home. Said Boumedouha, Amnesty's deputy director for the Middle East and North Africa region, stated that it was unclear what "pressures" the women may have endured during their detention, or if they had ever been charged for a crime.
