= Abdul Khaleq (disambiguation) =

Abdul Khaleq (died 1974) was a Bangladeshi politician and freedom fighter.

Abdul Khaleq may also refer to:

- Abdul Khaleq Alghanem (1958–2021), Saudi Arabian film director
- Ahmed Abdul Khaleq (born 1977), blogger and activist of the stateless Bedoon minority in the United Arab Emirates
- Muhammad Abdul Khaleq, Bangladeshi politician
- K M Abdul Khaleq Chontu, Bangladeshi politician
