= Nasser Bin Ghaith =

UAE Activist and Academic

Nasser bin Ghaith Al Marri
- Occupations: Academic, Lecturer, Economist
- Known for: UAE Five Trial, UAE 84 Trial, Activism

Academic background
- Education: Bachelor's degree in Law, Dubai Police Academy Masters in Commercial Law, Western Reserve University PhD in economic groupings, University of Essex

Academic work
- Discipline: Economics, International Relations, Law
- Sub-discipline: Economic groupings

Nasser bin Ghaith Al Marri (Arabic: ناصر بن غيث المري) is an academic and human rights activist from the United Arab Emirates. He was a figure in the UAE Five and UAE 84 trials. Bin Ghaith was arrested in 2015, and sentenced to 10 years in prison in 2017. He was charged with "committing a hostile act against a foreign country" in relation to Egypt, as well as "posting false information" about UAE leaders.

== Education ==
Bin Ghaith is an academic with a PhD in economics, with certifications in law, economics, and international relations. He received his Bachelor's Degree in Law from Dubai Police Academy, his Master's in Commercial Law from the Western Reserve University in Cleveland, and his PhD in economic groupings from the University of Essex. At the time of his arrest, he was a lecturer at the Paris-based Sorbonne University's Abu Dhabi campus. Notably, he was the first Arab lecturer to be employed at the institution.

== Human rights context in the United Arab Emirates ==
Main Article: Human rights in the United Arab Emirates

The UAE's human rights and freedoms are significantly restricted relative to the rest of the world. The UAE has made no official commitment to freedom of speech. It is illegal to criticise the royal family, police, or any government institution or official. These laws are in effect in person and online. Any person who posts criticism online will face the same repercussions. UAE authorities have used torture, as well as enforced disappearances of prisoners. Prisoners have also been denied contact from family, or have had severely restricted contact.

== UAE Five arrest and trial ==
Main Article: UAE Five

In 2011, bin Ghaith, along with four other activists, were arrested and put on trial for "publicly insulting" UAE officials, by calling for "democratic and economic reforms". These calls were a part of the region-wide pro-democratic movement; the Arab Spring. The five were convicted, and bin Ghaith was sentenced to 2 years in prison by the State Security Court of Abu Dhabi. The arrests and convictions received international attention from media outlets such as the New York Times, BBC News, and attention from human rights advocacy organisations such as Amnesty International. The next day, the five received a presidential pardon from Former President Sheikh Khalifa bin Zayed Al-Nahyan.

== Second arrest and trial ==
In 2015, bin Ghaith was arrested by UAE state security forces in plainclothes and held in an undisclosed location for nearly 8 months. Bin Ghaith was denied communication with family and legal representation. Bin Ghaith faced several national security-related charges, including insulting the UAE government and leadership, communicating with secret terrorist organisations, and posting what authorities classified as "false information." At the time, bin Ghaith maintained a popular "Twitter" (now known as "X") account, where he raised concerns about human rights.

The charges stemmed from a series of tweets in which bin Ghaith criticised Egyptian authorities, particularly concerning the "Rabaa Massacre," as well as his meetings with human rights activists. Despite the absence of concrete evidence, bin Ghaith was convicted of all the charges laid against him and sentenced to ten years in prison in March 2017.

== UAE84 trial ==
In December 2023, UAE authorities charged at least 84 individuals in connection with the formation of the independent advocacy group, the Justice and Dignity Committee, established in 2010. Many of the defendants were already serving prison sentences for similar offences. The Emirates Detainees Advocacy Center reported that on 10 July 2024, the Abu Dhabi Federal Appeals Court issued sentences ranging from 10 years to life imprisonment to 53 defendants in the UAE’s second-largest mass trial, commonly referred to as the "UAE84" case. The accused were not charged with any new offences but were being tried again for charges linked to their previous involvement in the group, for which they had already faced prosecution.

In January 2024, the 84 defendants were accused of "establishing and managing a clandestine terrorist organisation" under the UAE's 2014 counterterrorism law. Bin Ghaith was among five individuals sentenced to 15 years in prison, accused of "cooperating with the terrorist organisation," based on evidence reused from his 2016-17 trial.

== Imprisonment ==
After bin Ghaith’s arrest in August 2015, various human rights organisations have since raised concerns regarding his treatment in detention. According to reports from Scholars at Risk (SAR), his arrest was carried out by plainclothes security officers who searched his home and confiscated personal belongings, including electronics. Following his arrest, he was reportedly held in solitary confinement. During a 2016 court hearing, bin Ghaith claimed that he had been subjected to physical violence and sleep deprivation while in detention, though these claims were not addressed by the presiding judge.

Bin Ghaith has engaged in hunger strikes to protest his detention and the conditions at Al-Razeen Prison, where he is currently being held. In April 2017 and February 2018, he undertook hunger strikes in response to his treatment in prison. In October 2018, he began another hunger strike, which, as of 18 December 2018, had lasted over seventy days. Bin Ghaith's 2018 strike followed the release of other detainees, including Matthew Hedges, a PhD candidate at Durham University, while his own release was denied.

Advocacy groups have reported that authorities at Al-Razeen Prison have denied bin Ghaith essential medical care, including medication for high blood pressure. In Al-Sadar prison, bin Ghaith was reportedly denied essential items, such as his glasses, for a number of weeks. Since September 2018, bin Ghaith has reportedly been denied family visits. Allegations of abuse, torture, sexual harassment, strip searches, and denial of medical care in Al-Razeen Prison have been raised by various organisations, though investigations into these claims have not been publicly addressed by the authorities.

The UAE government has not publicly responded to these allegations, but it has previously stated that its legal and penal systems operate in compliance with international human rights standards. The concerns raised by international NGOs continue to draw attention to the conditions of bin Ghaith’s imprisonment and the broader issue of human rights in the region.

Human rights organisations, advocacy groups, and major news outlets such as the BBC and The New York Times have reported on the UAE 84 trials, drawing significant mainstream attention.

== NGO activism for Nasser bin Ghaith's release ==
SAR issued a call to the UAE authorities on 26 April 2016, requesting the release of bin Ghaith or the disclosure of his whereabouts and the charges against him. According to SAR, UAE state security forces arrested bin Ghaith on 18 August 2015 and detained him in an undisclosed location, where he was allegedly denied access to his family, legal representation, and medical care.

On 17 May 2016, SAR, in collaboration with nine other NGOs including the Arabic Network for Human Rights Information (ANHRI), ARTICLE 19, CIVICUS, FIDH, Front Line Defenders (FLD), Gulf Centre for Human Rights (GCHR), Index on Censorship, and the International Service for Human Rights (ISHR), issued an open letter urging the UAE to release bin Ghaith and drop the charges against him. The NGOs also called for transparency regarding his location, access to legal and medical support, adherence to international due process standards, and investigations into reports of ill-treatment during detention.

Human Rights Watch (HRW) also voiced concerns, issuing a statement on 12 October 2016, accusing the UAE authorities of violating international standards of free speech. HRW has pointed to the charges against bin Ghaith as evidence of the UAE’s broader efforts to criminalise peaceful dissent. The organisation claims that the laws invoked in his case are violations of international standards on freedom of expression and association.

On 4 August 2017, the United Nations Working Group on Arbitrary Detention communicated with the UAE government regarding bin Ghaith’s case, requesting information on his charges and location. On 15 January 2018, the UN issued an opinion calling for bin Ghaith’s immediate release and the provision of compensation and reparations. The UN Working Group criticised the UAE’s handling of the case, citing concerns about arbitrary arrest, secret detention, and violations of bin Ghaith’s right to a fair trial.
