= Sivasubramaniam =

Sivasubramaniam is a Tamil name and may refer to

- Sivasubramaniam Raveendranath, Sri Lankan Tamil academic
- Sivasubramaniam Kathiravelupillai, Sri Lankan Tamil lawyer and politician
- Sivasubramaniam Pathmanathan, Sri Lankan Tamil historian
- V. Sivasubramaniam, Sri Lankan Tamil judge
