= Michael Rubin (historian) =

American historian and defense expert (born 1971)

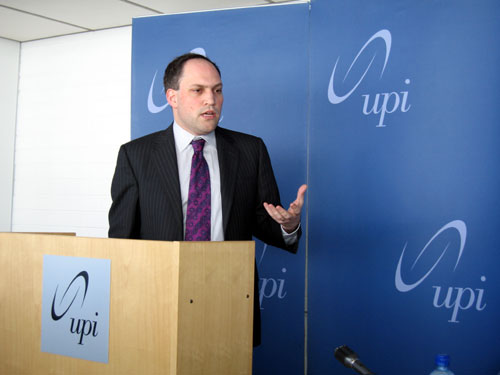
- Born: 1971 (age 54–55); Philadelphia, Pennsylvania, U.S.
- Occupations: Lecturer, adviser, policy analyst

Academic background
- Education: Yale University (BS, PhD)
- Thesis: The Formation of Modern Iran, 1858–1909: Communications, Telegraph and Society (1999)
- Doctoral advisor: Abbas Amanat

Academic work
- Institutions: Naval Postgraduate School (2007–2021); Foreign Military Studies Office (2012–2024); American Enterprise Institute
- Main interests: History of Iran; Arab culture Kurdish studies Shi'ite politics

Michael Allan Rubin (born 1971) is an American historian, foreign policy analyst, government adviser, and military lecturer. He holds the position of a senior fellow at the American Enterprise Institute (AEI). He previously worked as an official at the Pentagon, where he dealt with issues relating to the Middle East, and as political adviser to the Coalition Provisional Authority in US-occupied Iraq.

== Biography ==
=== Early life ===
A native of Philadelphia, Rubin earned both his B.S. in biology (1994) and his Ph.D. in history (1999) from Yale University. His dissertation, The Formation of Modern Iran, 1858–1909: Communications, Telegraph and Society, written under the guidance of Abbas Amanat, won Yale's John Addison Porter Prize.

He spent time with the Taliban before the September 11 attacks of 2001, and lived in the Islamic Republic of Iran, in Ba'athist Iraq, and in Yemen.

=== Career ===
After teaching history at Yale University (1999–2000), Rubin worked as a visiting lecturer at the University of Sulaymaniyah, the Salahaddin University in Erbil, and the University of Duhok in the Kurdistan Region of Iraq (2000–2001). He held consecutive fellowships at the Carnegie Council for Ethics in International Affairs (2000–2001), at the Hebrew University's Leonard Davis Institute for International Relations (2001–2002), and at the Council on Foreign Relations (2002–2003).

From 2002 until 2004, Rubin served as a staff adviser on Iran and Iraq for the Office of the Secretary of Defense. Between 2003 and 2004, Rubin worked as a political adviser to the Coalition Provisional Authority in Baghdad.

From 2007 to 2021, he taught Middle Eastern and Horn of Africa politics to U.S. Army, U.S. Marine, and U.S. Navy senior officers and units prior to their deployment in Iraq, the Persian Gulf, and Afghanistan as a senior lecturer at the Naval Postgraduate School. He served as an international election observer during the 2008 Bangladeshi general election. He was also a lecturer at Johns Hopkins University in Baltimore in 2010 and a contract analyst at the Foreign Military Studies Office from 2012 to 2024.

In 2023, he became a director of policy analysis at the Middle East Forum.

Rubin served as assistant editor of the Iranian Studies journal (1994–1997) and as editor of the Middle East Quarterly (2004–2009). He was also a contributing editor for the online national security website 19FortyFive from 2021 to 2024, while it was headed by J. Beth Gorton.

== Work, views and reactions ==
In 2016, Rubin was accused by an Amnesty International analyst of accepting payment from the United Arab Emirates for an article critical of the imprisoned Emirati economist Nasser bin Ghaith.

In June 2017, Turkey's president Recep Tayyip Erdoğan filed a criminal complaint against Rubin in a Turkish court for allegedly "supporting and committing offenses for the Fethullahist Terror Organization". Turkey then sent Twitter a court order demanding Rubin's account to be taken down for criticizing the purges in Turkey and alleging that Erdoğan was leading his country to ruin. In December 2017, a business ally of Erdoğan offered a reward of three million Turkish lira (almost $800,000) for help in bringing Rubin to Turkey to answer terrorism allegations in connection with the 2016 Turkish coup d'état attempt.

In September 2022, towards the end of the Tigray war, Rubin called on the US to provide military support for the Tigray People's Liberation Front against Abiy Ahmed's federal government of Ethiopia.

In November 2022, Russia's Ministry of Foreign Affairs imposed personal sanctions on Rubin due to his support for Ukraine in the ongoing Russo-Ukrainian war.

In January 2023, Rubin appealed to United States Secretary of State Antony Blinken to place the Kurdistan Region of Iraq on the watch list under the International Religious Freedom Act of 1998. Following the October 7 attacks of 2023, Rubin publicly argued that Israel should consider arming the Kurdistan Workers' Party (a group he had previously criticized for "sullying the Kurdish cause in general" and denounced as terrorist) as a "plan B" against Turkey, which he described as "a Hamas-sponsoring, Islamist, and increasingly anti-Semitic country".

== Books ==
=== Authored ===
- Into the Shadows: Radical Vigilantes in Khatami's Iran. Washington: Washington Institute for Near East Policy, 2001. (ISBN 9780944029459)
- Eternal Iran: Continuity and Chaos (with Patrick Clawson). London: Palgrave Macmillan, 2005. (ISBN 978-1403962768)
- The Shi'ites of the Middle East: An Iranian Fifth Column? (with Ahmad Majidyar). AEI Press, 2014.
- Dancing with the Devil: The Perils of Engaging Rogue Regimes. New York: Encounter Books, 2014. (ISBN 978-1594037238)
- Kurdistan Rising. AEI Press, 2016.

=== Edited ===
- Dissent and Reform in the Arab World. AEI Press, 2008.
- Seven Pillars: What Really Causes Instability in the Middle East? (with Brian Katulis). AEI Press, 2019.
