= Committee of Concerned Scientists =

International scientific organization

The Committee of Concerned Scientists (CCS) is an independent international organization devoted to the protection and advancement of human rights and scientific freedom of scientists, physicians, engineers, and scholars.

== History ==
The Committee was formed in 1972 in Washington and New York as an ad hoc group of scientists and scholars concerned about violations of academic freedom and the persecution of scientists around the world. (Sometimes, the creation of the Committee is dated to 1973.)

Most of the activities of the Committee in the 1970s and 1980s were aimed to help refuseniks and dissident scholars in the Soviet Union and Soviet bloc countries.

The Committee lobbied both the Soviet and Western governments on behalf of these oppressed scholars, provided moral and financial support to them, and organized conferences and meetings of refuseniks, including in the Soviet Union itself. Sometimes, the Committee of Concerned Scientists is credited with having coined the actual term "refusenik". The Committee played an active role in helping such Soviet dissidents as Andrei Sakharov, Natan Sharansky, Yuri Orlov, Benjamin Levich, and others. From 1978 to 2003, CCS worked in close collaboration with the New York Academy of Sciences which published the proceedings of several refusnik conferences.

Subsequently, CCS expanded its activities to pursue human rights and academic freedom issues in other countries.

For example, CCS lobbied both the Chinese and the U.S. governments on behalf of the Chinese astrophysicist Fang Lizhi, who supported dissident students during the 1989 Tiananmen Square massacre. After his immigration to the U.S., Fang Lizhi served on the CCS himself. In 2019, CCS made the case to Donald Trump, then U.S. president, to end a described campaign to intimidate U.S. scientists of Chinese ethnicity. Much of the focus of CCS in China has been on the situation of political prisoners and of minority scholars and teachers, including those of Uyghur, Tibetan, and Mongolian ethnicity. For example, CCS wrote about the case of ethnic Mongolian dissident and Nobel Peace Prize nominee Hada. CCS has written about the case of Wang Bingzhang, former surgeon and researcher, and of Yang Hengjun, Australian-Chinese novelist and academic, both accused of espionage as well as Xu Zhiyong, and Huang Qi, who were accused of subversion. In regards to Uyghurs, CCS has advocated on behalf of scholars such as Ilham Tohti, Rahile Dawut,, Tashpolat Tiyip,, Abduweli Ayup, and Abdulqadir Jalaleddin. Additionally CCS has advocated on behalf of academics in Hong Kong such as Benny tai Yiu-ting and Shiu Ka-chun.

In 2001, the CCS lobbied the Russian government and the Russian President Vladimir Putin in support of the Russian scientist Igor Sutyagin, who was accused by the FSB (the successor agency to the KGB) of treason and espionage.

In 2016, CCS made an appeal to then-Chilean President Michelle Bachelet to reopen the case of Boris Weisfeiler, a mathematician who disappeared in Chile in 1985.

The CCS has addressed alleged violations of the human rights of scholars in the following countries: Angola, Azerbaijan, Bahrain, Bangladesh, Belarus, Brazil, Bulgaria, Cameroon, Canada, Chile, China, Cuba, Ecuador, Egypt, Ethiopia, France, Greece, India, Indonesia, Iran, Iraq, Israel, Italy, Malaysia, Mongolia, Morocco, Nicaragua, Pakistan, Peru, Philippines, Poland, Russia, Saudi Arabia, Serbia, Sierra Leone, Spain, Sudan, Swaziland, Syria, Thailand, Turkey, Turkmenistan, Uganda, Ukraine, United Arab Emirates, United Kingdom, United States, Uzbekistan, Venezuela, Vietnam, and Zimbabwe.

== Activities ==
The Committee issues an annual report about cases of abuse of academic freedom and human rights of scientists and scholars around the world.

== Members ==
Prominent scientists who served as CCS board members include a substantial number of Nobel Prize winners, such as Paul Flory, Gerhard Herzberg, David Baltimore, Owen Chamberlain, Jerome Karle, Walter Kohn, Marshall Warren Nirenberg, John Charles Polanyi, Charles Hard Townes, Steven Weinberg, Rosalyn Sussman Yalow, and others.

Mathematical physicist Joel Lebowitz has been the long-term co-chair of the CCS, alongside the other three current co-chairs: physicist Eugene Chudnovsky, psychiatrist Walter Reich, and chemist Alexander Greer.

Mark Mellman was the first executive director of CCS. He was followed by Dorothy Hirsch, Maude Kozodoy, and Sarah Penso. Sophie Cook, a retired government lawyer and mediator, served as executive director from 2008 to 2015. Carol Susan Valoris filled the role from 2015 to 2021. Suzanne Garment followed in 2021 to 2022, with Valoris returning from retirement in 2022 after Garment needed to step down for personal reasons. She was succeeded by Alexandra Bender from 2023 to 2025. The current executive director is Edyta Greer.

== See also ==
- Scholars at Risk
- Council for At-Risk Academics (CARA)
