= Rori Donaghy =

Rori Donaghy, born September 1986, is a Public Policy Manager at Meta. He was previously a news editor with the Middle East Eye and was the Director of the Emirates Centre for Human Rights between March 2012 and March 2014, a UK human rights organisation centred on the United Arab Emirates (UAE).

In his capacity as ECHR Director, Donaghy was interviewed by major media in the UK including the BBC World Service and BBC Radio 5 and his writing appeared in The Guardian and The Huffington Post.

In April 2012, Donaghy visited the UAE where he interviewed Emiratis claiming to be victims of human rights abuses.

From 2012, Donaghy was a "key target" of Project Raven; a UAE clandestine surveillance and hacking operation, targeting other governments, militants and human rights activists critical of the UAE monarchy. Donaghy was given code name "Gyro" in Project Raven, while another main target, Ahmed Mansoor, was code named " Egret".

== See also ==
- DarkMatter (Emirati company)
- Hacking Team
