= Xinjiang University =

Provincial public university in Ürümqi, Xinjiang, China

- 新疆大学 شىنجاڭ ئۇنىۋېرستېتى
- Type: Public
- Established: 1924; 102 years ago
- Undergraduates: > 20,000
- Location: Ürümqi, Xinjiang, China; 43°45′54″N 87°37′12″E
- Campus: Urban
- Website: xju.edu.cn

Xinjiang University (XJU) is a provincial public comprehensive university in Ürümqi, Xinjiang, China. It is a national key university affiliated with the Xinjiang Uyghur Autonomous Region and co-funded by the Ministry of Education and the regional government. The university is part of Project 211 and the Double First-Class Construction.

Established in 1924 in Ürümqi, Xinjiang University is a comprehensive university with the highest academic level in Xinjiang. The Best Chinese Universities Ranking, also known as the "Shanghai Ranking," placed the university the best in Xinjiang and 129th in China.

== Establishment and location ==
In 1924, Xinjiang Russian and Law School was founded, which is known as the former school of Xinjiang University. In 1935, it was converted to Xinjiang College. Xinjiang University was named in 1960; it is in the southern part of Ürümqi. Among its prominent leaders was Du Zhongyuan, who was executed in 1943 on suspicion of being subversive.

It is a national key comprehensive university with students from various ethnic groups. It is one of two in Xinjiang entering the national "211 Project." On December 30, 2000, the former Xinjiang University and Xinjiang Engineering Institute merged into a new Xinjiang University. In the past 78 years, it has seen 65,000 students graduate.

== Colleges ==
Xinjiang University comprises fourteen schools, which have courses and branches of study ranging from science, engineering, law and economics to management, the arts and history. A new major in intellectual property was created in 2013. XJU has three campuses: the Main Campus, the North Campus and the South Campus.

== Academics ==
There are three Ph.D. programs, 46 Masters' programs and 75 undergraduate majors. The university has research institutions in these areas of study:

- Economics
- Arid Ecology
- Math Theory
- Demography
- Applied Chemistry
- Central Asian Culture
- Altaic Study
- Architectural Design

The Minorities Folklore Research Center at Xinjiang University was founded by Rahile Dawut.

== Rankings and reputation ==
The Best Chinese Universities Ranking, also known as the "Shanghai Ranking," placed the university 129th in China.

Xinjiang University was ranked 601–700th globally by the Academic Ranking of World Universities (ARWU). The university ranked # 695 in the world by the University Rankings by Academic Performance 2024–2025. It was ranked 1017th in the world by the Center for World University Rankings 2025. It was ranked # 1317 globally and 448th in Asia in the 2024 Best Global Universities by the U.S. News & World Report Best Global University Ranking.

The 2025 CWTS Leiden Ranking ranked XJU at #438 in the world and #193 in Asia based on their publications for the period 2020–2023. The Nature Index Research Leaders 2025 ranked XJU among the top 450 leading universities globally for the high quality of research publications in natural science.

Overall, Xinjiang University was ranked among the top 1500 universities worldwide according to several major international universities rankings.

== Asteroid ==
Asteroid 192450 Xinjiangdaxue was named in honor of the university. The official naming citation was published by the Minor Planet Center on 25 September 2018 (M.P.C. 111803).

== Notable alumni ==
- Tashpolat Tiyip
- Yang Gang

== Notable faculty ==
- Rahile Dawut
- Du Zhongyuan
- Tashpolat Tiyip
- Ibrahim Muti'i
- Wushour Silamu

== See also ==
- List of universities in Xinjiang
- List of universities in China
