= Scholars at Risk =

International network of academic institutions

- Nickname: SAR
- Founder: Robert Quinn
- Founded at: University of Chicago
- Type: INGO
- Purpose: to protect scholars and promote academic freedom
- Headquarters: New York University
- Locations: New York, New York; Maynooth University, Ireland
- Website: www.scholarsatrisk.org

Scholars at Risk (SAR) is an international network of academic institutions organized to support and defend the principles of academic freedom and to defend the human rights of scholars around the world. As of 2024, network membership is reported as including over 650 higher educational institutions in over 40 countries.

== History ==
Scholars at Risk was founded as part of a Human Rights Program at the University of Chicago in 1999 where it launched with a large conference in June 2000. It has its headquarters in the Greenwich Village campus of New York University. Rob Quinn is the executive director of Scholars at Risk.

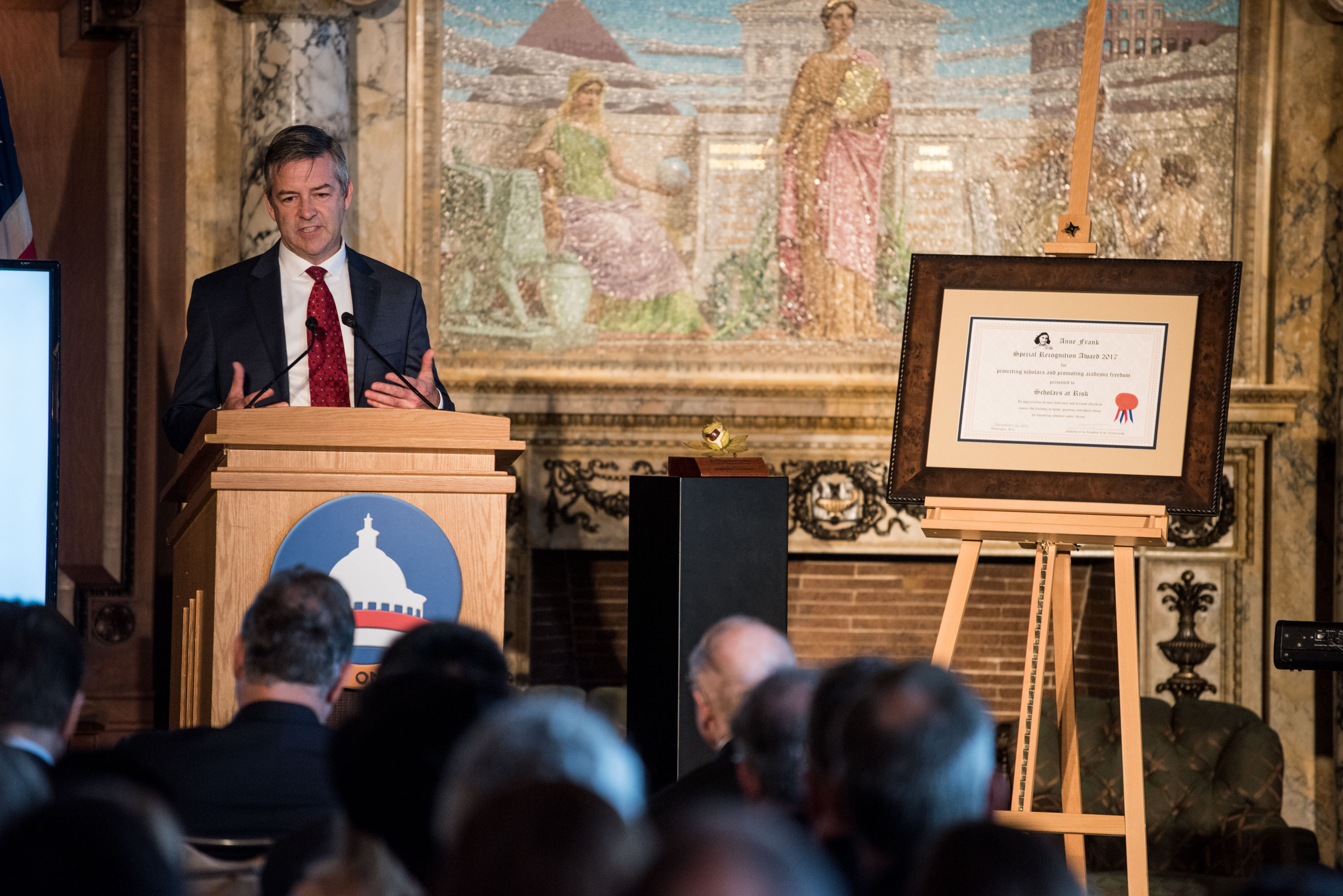
Scholars at Risk receives the Anne Frank Award 2017 -director Rob Quinn

In 2001, Scholars at Risk joined with other international education and human rights organizations to launch the Network for Education and Academic Rights (NEAR). When NEAR disbanded SAR continued this work through its Academic Freedom Media Review, Scholars-in-Prison Project and Academic Freedom Monitoring Project.

In 2002, SAR partnered with the Institute of International Education which was then establishing IIE's Scholar Rescue Fund. The Fund provides financial support to scholars facing grave threats so that they may escape dangerous conditions and continue their academic work in safety.

In 2003, the network headquarters relocated from the University of Chicago to the New York City campus of New York University. In 2005, SAR and partners began organizing SAR 'sections' and 'partner networks' around the world, building a global community pledged to help scholars and promote academic freedom everywhere.

From 2007 to 2010, SAR led a series of workshops to provide a safe, open forum for academics and advocates from around the world to discuss the regional dimensions of academic freedom and the challenges faced, and to develop joint responses. These led to the development of an academic freedom curriculum and in 2011 to the Academic Freedom Advocacy Team, which researched protection for academic freedom under international human rights law.

In 2012, SAR launched the Academic Freedom Monitoring Project, through which volunteer researchers document attacks on higher education in specific countries or regions which are then published in a report. The first Free to Think report was published in 2015 and since then it has been published annually.

In 2014, SAR formalized the Student Advocacy Seminar, an initiative through which faculty researchers help students develop research and advocacy skills while investigating attacks on higher education communities.

== Activities ==
SAR's activities are organized under three main pillars: Protection, Advocacy and Learning.

== Programs ==
The Scholars at Risk (SAR) network operates a variety of programs aimed at responding and protecting threatened scholars, advancing academic freedom, and engaging global communities in human rights advocacy. These programs, offered by universities and institutions, aim to create a meaningful impact within the university space. As part of its broader efforts SAR also works to support displaced scholars, offering fellowships, opportunities for relocation, and other forms of assistance.

One example of this is the Scholars at Risk program at Harvard University run through Harvard that offers similar initiatives as the SAR Network through academic fellowships. The Harvard program emphasizes the consequences of a Scholars ethnicity, religion, gender, sexual orientation, identity, or political opinions as a risk factor. SAR Harvard relies on private donors to ensure its advocacy and protection for scholars.

SAR programs show how universities are increasingly stepping into roles that go beyond research and education. Scholars like Paul Gready and Emma Jackson have researched this shift, and have pointed out the ways academic institutions are becoming active protectors of individuals and core values, such as human rights and academic freedom. By offering fellowships and creating platforms for advocacy, universities are not just responding to crises, but are also helping to preserve the principles in academic life.

Programs like these reflect a broader shift in how universities are responding to global crisis. Institutions are increasingly stepping into humanitarian roles by using their academic platforms to support displaced and threatened scholars. In doing so, they work in the intersection of education and humanitarian response, offering refuge and protection while continuing to uphold values of academic freedom. Some researchers, including Adam Hedgerow, have noted that academic freedom can also be constrained by a university's internal structures, like ethics review boards. In ways they may favor institutional interest, like protecting the university's public image over the independence of academic research. This suggest that universities can function both as protectors of academic freedoms.

=== Protection Services ===
SAR arranges temporary academic positions at higher education institutions for scholars whose lives and careers are at risk due to their work, identity, or beliefs. These appointments, typically ranging from six months to two years, allow scholars to continue their research and teaching in safety. Since its founding in 2000, SAR has assisted more than 2,000 scholars from over 100 countries.

=== Advocacy Campaigns ===
Dr. Ahmadreza Djalali, an Iranian-Swedish disaster medicine expert, and Dr. Rahile Dawut, a Uyghur anthropologist, are both women who have face imprisonment under authoritarian regimes. Despite their academic contribution, they have faced detention under politically motivated charges. Scholars at Risk (SAR) advocates for scholars in similar situations through its Scholars in Prison project, SAR campaigns on behalf of detained and silenced academics. The project focuses on raising awareness and support through international advocacy, protection, letter-writing campaigns, and public awareness initiatives. These efforts aim to protect academic freedom and promote the fair treatment of scholars worldwide.

SAR challenges the idea that at-risk scholars should only be seen as victims in need of saving. Instead it works to remind the public of their professional identities and continued academic value, even in the face of persecution. Instead of letting their identities be reduced to just their circumstances, SAR helps keep attention on who they are as professionals, which is just as important in the fight to support them.

Some scholars, have argued that when universities and academic networks engage in activism, like campaigns led by SAR, they are stepping into an important role in the protection of human rights. Supporting scholars who face political repression is not just about academic solidarity, but it also reflects the growing expectation that universities act in response to global democratic crisis. SAR's advocacy campaigns can be seen as part of a larger shift, where academic institutions can take on more roles by defending scholars and the values their work represents.

=== Academic Freedom Monitoring ===
The Academic Freedom Monitoring Project documents attacks on higher education globally, including incidents of imprisonment, violence, and restrictions on academic expression. SAR publishes its findings annually in the Free to Think report series, which is used by policymakers, universities, and advocacy groups.

=== Legal and Policy Engagement ===
SAR also contributes to legal and policy advocacy by submitting amicus briefs, participating in international consultations, and promoting the inclusion of academic freedom in human rights instruments. The organization collaborates with the UN Special Rapporteurs and regional networks to strengthen legal protections for scholars and institutions.

=== Student Advocacy Seminars ===
Scholars at Risk (SAR) organizes student-led seminars at universities around the world to engage undergraduates in advocacy for imprisoned scholars. These seminars focus on a variety of activities, including legal research, storytelling, and public outreach, offering students practical experience in human rights advocacy. A goal of the Scholars at Risk Network is to maintain the goals of the detained scholars until release or arrival at home countries.

SAR's student-led seminars and public campaigns show how universities are becoming more involved in human rights efforts, not just through academic work but through hands-on advocacy. Universities can take on more active roles in global justice movements, especially in times of political unrest. By supporting initiatives like SAR, colleges and universities give students and faculty the change to contribute directly to protecting academic freedom and supporting scholars who face persecution.

The Student Advocacy Coordinator, Adam Braver plays a key role in organizing these seminars, often focusing on specific scholar who are facing significant risk. Through these initiatives, SAR ensures that the advocacy for detained scholar continues, supporting their efforts until they are released or safely return to their home countries. Each seminar usually centers on one or more scholar at risk, giving students a direct way to support academic freedom and stand up for global human rights.

By taking part in these efforts, students can go beyond classroom learning and become active participants in global academic freedom advocacy. It's a way for them to use their skills and voices to support scholars and defend academic freedom, showing that even local, student-driven actions can have a broader impact. Through these small initiatives, SAR helps encourage a new generation of individuals committed to protecting academic rights and freedoms around the world.

=== Global Networking and Events ===
SAR organizes conferences, public lectures, and workshops, including the SAR Global Congress, which convenes academics, policymakers, and civil society leaders. These gatherings provide opportunities for dialogue and collaboration on protecting academic freedom worldwide.

In addition to formal events, SAR also encourages opportunities for more casual, community based networking among members. These connections allow people across different countries and institutions to exchange ideas, raise awareness about urgent cases, and support one another's efforts.

== Scholars who SAR has advocated or is advocating for ==
- Abdulqadir Jalaleddin, China
- Ahmadreza Djalali, Iran
- Gokarakonda Naga Saibaba, India
- Hatoon Al-Fassi, Saudi Arabia
- Ilham Tohti, China
- Khalil Al-Halwachi, Bahrain
- Mosab Abu Toha, Palestine
- Sivasubramaniam Raveendranath, Sri Lanka
- Niloufar Bayani, Iran
- Nasser bin Ghaith, United Arab Emirates
- Omid Kokabee, Iran
- Patrick George Zaki, Egypt
- Paul Chambers, Thailand
- Rahile Dawut, China
- Tashpolat Tiyip, China
- Xiyue Wang, Iran

== Structure ==
In 2003, the network headquarters relocated from the University of Chicago to the New York City campus of New York University. In 2018 a European office was opened in Ireland at Maynooth University. SAR has sections in different countries which coordinate activities for domestic SAR members.

=== SAR Sections ===
In 2005, SAR and partners began organizing SAR 'sections' and 'partner networks' around the world, building a global community pledged to help scholars and promote academic freedom everywhere. SAR sections were established in Israel (2005, now dormant), the United Kingdom (2006, with CARA), the Netherlands (2009, with UAF), Ireland (2009, with Universities Ireland), Norway (2011), Canada (2012), Switzerland (2015), Sweden (2016), Germany (2016), Finland (2017), United States (2018), Denmark (2019), Italy (2019), and Slovakia (2019), while partner networks were formed with pre-existing higher education networks in Europe, the Middle East and Africa.

Section	Year established
SAR Canada	2012
SAR United States	2018
SAR Norway	2011
CARA-SAR UK Universities network	
SAR Ireland	2009
SAR Sweden	2016
SAR Switzerland	2017
UAF-SAR Netherlands and Belgium	
SAR Germany	2016
SAR Finland	2017
SAR Denmark	2019
SAR Italy	2019
SAR Slovakia	2019

== Affiliations and partnerships ==
Scholars at Risk maintains affiliations and partnerships with other associations and organizations with related objectives.

SAR has formed the following Partner Networks:

EUA-SAR Partner Network: With 850 members across 47 countries, the European University Association is the largest and most comprehensive organisation representing universities in Europe. 17 million students are enrolled at EUA member universities. As the voice of Europe's universities, EUA supports and takes forward the interests of individual institutions and the higher education sector as a whole.

Magna Charta Observatory: In September 2015, Scholars at Risk and Magna Charta agreed to create a formal partner network including 802 universities in 85 countries.

UNICA-SAR Partner Network: UNICA is a network of 46 universities from 35 capital cities of Europe. Its role is to promote academic excellence, integration and cooperation between member universities throughout Europe. It seeks also to be a driving force in the development of the Bologna process and to facilitate the integration of universities from Central and Eastern Europe into the European Higher Education Area.

Compostela Group of Universities: Founded in 1993, the Compostela Group of Universities is an international nonprofit association that now consists of more than 60 universities in 27 countries. CGU seeks to strengthen the channels of communication between its member universities; organize events for the study and discussion of different issues related to international higher education; and promote mobility and collaboration between members as a basis for enhancing the knowledge of cultures and languages.

Communauté Université Grenoble Alpes: The Communauté Université Grenoble Alpes (COMUE) joined SAR as a partner network in January 2017. COMUE was formed in France in December 2014 and is composed of six member and four associated higher education institutions. Its mission is to create a multidisciplinary research university with a high international profile and strong local connection that creatively serves society.

swissuniversities: In 2012, universities, universities of applied sciences and universities of teacher education across Switzerland founded swissuniversities, a body dedicated to strengthening and enhancing collaboration among Swiss institutions of higher education and promoting a common voice on educational issues. swissuniversities also coordinates tasks and acts on the international level as the Swiss national rectors' conference for its 30-plus members.

Swiss Academies of Arts and Sciences: The academies engage themselves specifically for an equitable dialogue between science and society, and they advise politics and society in science-based issues that are relevant to society. They represent sciences across institutions and disciplines. Established in the scientific community, they have access to expertise and excellence and can therefore contribute specific knowledge to important political questions.

Consortium for North American Higher Education Collaboration: The Consortium for North American Higher Education (CONAHEC) fosters collaboration among institutions, organizations and agencies of higher education in Canada, Mexico, the United States, and around the world. CONAHEC develops programs and educational opportunities to prepare globally knowledgeable professionals able to contribute to the region's continued success and a better world.

Academy for Research and Higher Education (ARES): As the federation of francophone universities in the Wallonie region of southern Belgium, ARES coordinates the activities of 127 higher education institutions. ARES supports the participation and development of its member institutions in their local and international collaborations by promoting the international visibility of higher education.

International Migration, Integration and Social Cohesion (IMISCOE): IMISCOE is a European network of scholars in the area of migration and integration and works on comparative research and publications which are published in the IMISCOE book series and the CMS journal. IMISCOE has a solidarity fund and uses it to support their member institutes to host researchers under threat. To this end it has become a member of SAR. IMISCOE contributes to the training of young researchers and their exchange throughout Europe. Also, IMISCOE plays an important role in the mutual dialogue between researchers and society (policy, politics, civil society).

European Students' Union (ESU): The European Students' Union (ESU) is the umbrella organisation of 46 National Unions of Students (NUS) from 39 countries. The aim of ESU is to represent and promote the educational, social, economic and cultural interests of students at the European level towards all relevant bodies and in particular the European Union, Bologna Follow Up Group, Council of Europe and UNESCO. Through its members, ESU represents around 15 million students in Europe.

Mexican Association for International Education (AMPEI): The Mexican Association for International Education (Asociación Mexicana para la Educación Internacional) is a non-profit membership organization which aims to strengthen the academic quality of Mexican institutions of higher education through internationalization and international cooperation.

International Association of La Salle Universities (IALU): IALU is an effective instrument to strengthen Lasallian Higher Education, promote the development of the universities in its network and encourage individual and collective response to the expectations and requests made to universities.

== See also ==
- Council for At-Risk Academics
- Committee of Concerned Scientists
- Scholar Rescue Fund
