= Hassan al Diqqi =

Emirati politician (born 1957)

Hassan Ahmad Hassan Al Diqqi (Arabic: حسن أحمد حسن الدقّي) (born January 3, 1957) is an Emirati co-founder of Al Islah party in the United Arab Emirates and the leader of Emirates Al Ummah party.
