= Gamal Eid =

Egyptian human rights activist and lawyer

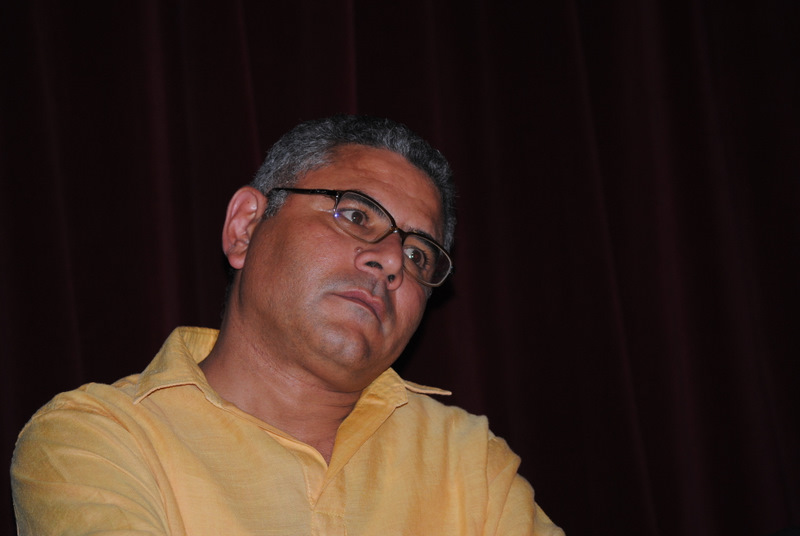
Gamal Eid

Gamal Eid (Arabic: جمال عيد; born 1964) is a leading Egyptian human rights activist and lawyer. He is the executive director of the Arabic Network for Human Rights Information (ANHRI), the most prominent organization dealing with the defense of freedom of opinion, belief and expression in the Arab world. He founded the ANHRI in 2003. He graduated from the College of Law in Ain Shams University.

As an attorney who specializes in human rights, Eid has represented several detainees in the custody of the State Security Investigations Service (SSI), which was dissolved in the 2011 Egyptian revolution. He has served as the defense for most human rights cases in Egypt. Eid was arrested on numerous occasions himself and was allegedly tortured by security officials. In 2004 he joined Kefaya, a grassroots movement that was founded to lobby the government of former president Hosni Mubarak.

Eid also specializes in internet issues. He stated that the internet has had an "immeasurable" effect on the documentation of human rights violations and the ability to hold government officials accountable.

== Awards ==
In 2011 Eid was awarded the Leaders for Democracy award by the Project of Middle East Democracy.
