= Abduweli Ayup =

Chinese linguist and poet

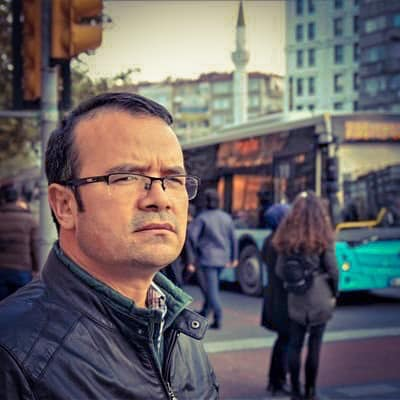
- Born: 1973 (age 52–53); Kashgar, Xinjiang, China
- Education: Central University for Nationalities; University of Kansas
- Occupations: Poet; linguist
- Writing career
- Language: Uyghur

Abduweli Ayup (Uyghur: ئابدۇۋېلى ئايۇپ; born April 1973) is a Western-educated linguist and poet who operated Uyghur language schools in Kashgar, Xinjiang, in the northwest part of China. The Uyghur Human Rights Project published his biography in Resisting Chinese Linguistic Imperialism: Abduweli Ayup and the Movement for Uyghur Mother Tongue-Based Education.

He is a strong proponent of linguistic human rights, specifically, the right for the intergenerational transmission of language and culture.

== Life ==
Ayup was born in Kashgar. He began studying at the Central University for Nationalities in Beijing in 1992, graduating in the late 1990s.

From December 2005 to June 2006, Abduweli was a visiting scholar at Ankara University, Turkey. He later received a Ford Foundation fellowship to study at the University of Kansas in the United States, and completed his master's degree in linguistics in 2011. Upon graduation, Abduweli returned to Xinjiang and opened schools to teach the Uyghur language, his mother tongue.

=== Arrest ===
Abduweli was arrested in Kashgar on August 20, 2013 by economic investigation team of Tianshan District, Ürümqi City and accused of false funding and illegally raising funds for his proposed schools. Along with him, Dilyar Obul and Muhemmet Sidik Abdurshit, two of his partners involved with the school, were also detained. Abduweli suffered through illness while in prison, where he was held incommunicado for nearly nine months. He was not formally charged until May 17, 2014, when he and his partners were accused of having collected "illegal donations" to support their school. After a one-day trial on July 11, on August 21 the court convicted Abduweli and his associates of having "committed a crime of abusing public money". According to the court, Abduweli and two of his partners had illegally accepted 590,000 CNY (about $95,000) in deposits from 17 people. During case processing time no one among the 17 have asked for their money back. Abduweli was sentenced to 18 months in prison and fined $13,000. Colleagues and human rights organizations contend that Abduweli's punishment is part of a government plan to marginalize and displace the Uyghur language.

The Linguistic Society of America and the Committee of Concerned Scientists appealed the President of China to investigate the circumstances under which Abduweli Ayup was detained, and petitioned for fair treatment as per China's obligations under International Law.

Supporters created a Facebook page advocating justice for Abduweli.

Abduwali was released on November 20, 2014, after his partners, Dilyar Obul and Muhemmet Sidik, appealed their verdict. Abduweli returned to Kashgar and continued to teach at his friends' language training school, which his wife, Miraghul, worked in his absence.

=== Life abroad ===
Ayup fled China in August 2015, first settling in Turkey, where he was living in 2018. While in Turkey, he founded Uyghur Hjelp, which provides aid to Uyghurs in Turkey and documents cases of missing Uyghur intellectuals.

Ayup has lived in Bergen, Norway with his two children since 2019. He continues to teach the Uyghur language to Uyghur diaspora children.

He is Muslim.

In 2021, Ayup was elected as Director of the Research Center of the World Uyghur Congress, an advocacy group designated as a terrorist organization by the government of the People's Republic of China in 2003.

In February 2025 Ayup was due to speak at a UNESCO conference on language technologies in Paris. After his presentation was cancelled at the last minute, he accused UNESCO of bowing to pressure from China.

=== Family ===
In 2017, Abduweli Ayup's brother, Erkin Ayup, was promoted as head of oversight for the Organization Department of the Chinese Communist Party in his hometown of Tokkuzak (Tuokezhake), Kona Sheher County (Shufu). He went missing that year, and was thought to have been sent to an re-education camp near Kashgar Airport. His sister was detained the same year and was forced to denounce him.

Ayup's niece, Mihray Erkin, is alleged to have died in state custody in 2020.

== Publications ==
=== Books ===
- The Black Land ; published in Turkish and Uyghur
  - English translation (forthcoming 2025), Selkies House Limited

=== Chapters ===
- Ayup, Abduweli; Tékin, Shungqar; Sidick, Erkin (2022). "Linguistic, Cultural, and Ethnic Genocide of the Uyghurs in Xinjiang, China". The Handbook of Linguistic Human Rights. John Wiley & Sons, Ltd. pp. 341–355. doi:10.1002/9781119753926.ch24. ISBN 978-1-119-75392-6.
- "Lost in Different Scripts". Uyghur Identity and Culture. Taylor & Francis. 2024. doi:10.4324/9781003305576-5/lost-different-scripts-abduweli-ayup. Archived from the original on 2024-04-30.
