= Du Zhongyuan =

Chinese wartime journalist (1895–1943)

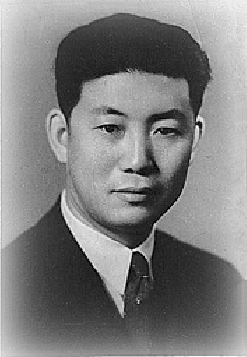

Du Zhongyuan (1895–1943) was one of China's best-known wartime journalists, having reported in great detail on the Japanese invasion and occupation of China during the Second Sino-Japanese War.

Born and raised in Manchuria, he went to Japan to study after gaining a scholarship. After finishing his studies there, Du returned to Manchuria to become a prominent businessman, running one of the most successful porcelain factories in the region. Later, Du began a new career, becoming a famous editorialist for the Shanghai journal Shenghuo zhoukan (Life Weekly), one of the best-selling weekly news journals of the era. He worked there with Zou Taofen. In 1941, shortly after accepting the position of head of Xinjiang University, Du was arrested when he aroused suspicions of being a Communist sympathizer. He was then executed in 1943.

As China went through the war against Japan, the civil war between Nationalists and Communists, and the shocks of the People's Republic period, memory of Du Zhongyuan faded. But he did not disappear permanently. In recent decades, his story has been revived, particularly in his home provinces in the Northeast of China: in the newly nationalistic atmosphere that marks contemporary China, he is portrayed as a patriot who spoke out at China's time of greatest need. As China becomes obsessed, after more than sixty years, with its war against Japan, Du's place in history seems likely to become more assured.

Du Zhongyuan is survived by his two daughters, Du Yi and Du Ying, both of whom live currently in Shanghai.
