= Wushour Silamu =

Chinese computer scientist

Wushour Silamu ھۇشۇر ئىسلام 吾守尔·斯拉木
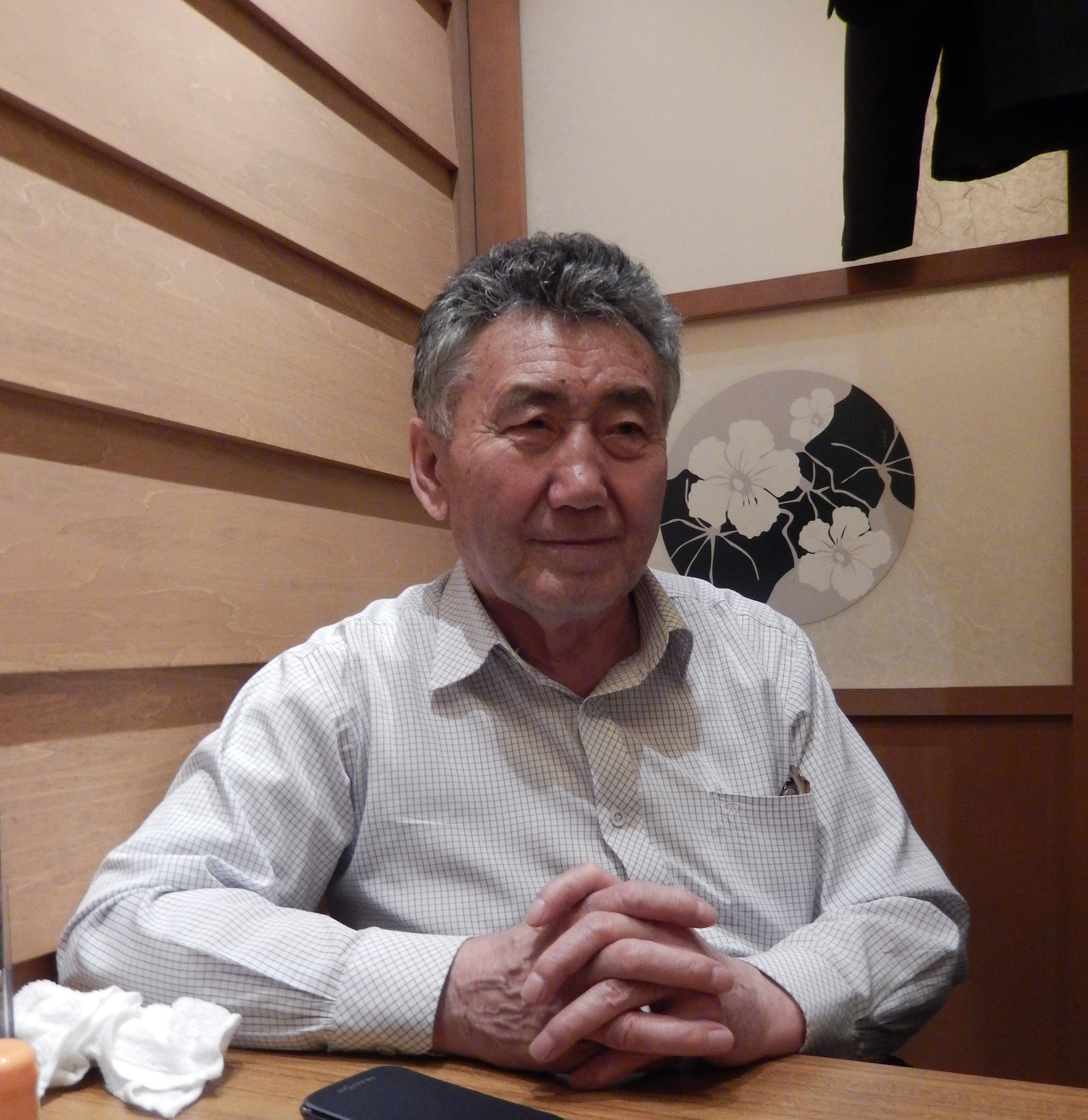
- Wushour Silamau in 2015
- Born: October 15, 1941 (age 84); Ili City, Ili Kazakh Autonomous Prefecture, Xinjiang, China
- Citizenship: China
- Education: Xinjiang University
- Scientific career
- Fields: Computer science
- Workplaces: Xinjiang University

Wushour Silamu or Wushour Slamu (Uyghur: ھۇشۇر ئىسلام, romanized: Hushur Islam, Ⱨuxur Islam; simplified Chinese: 吾守尔·斯拉木; traditional Chinese: 吾守爾·斯拉木; pinyin: Wúshǒu'ěr Sīlāmù; born 15 October 1941), is a Chinese computer scientist of Uyghur ethnicity. He is a professor at Xinjiang University in Ürümqi and specializes in multilingual computing, especially with reference to the Uyghur language and other minority languages of Xinjiang.

== Biography ==
Wushour was born in Yining, Xinjiang in 1941 and graduated from the Department of Physics at Xinjiang University in June 1964. He has held positions at Xinjiang University as vice-chair of the Department of Electronic Engineering and chair of the Department of Computing and is currently director of the Xinjiang Multilingual Information Processing Key Laboratory (Chinese: 新疆多语种信息处理重点实验室; pinyin: Xīnjiāng Duōyǔchóng Xìnxī Chǔlǐ Zhòngdiǎn Shíyànshì).

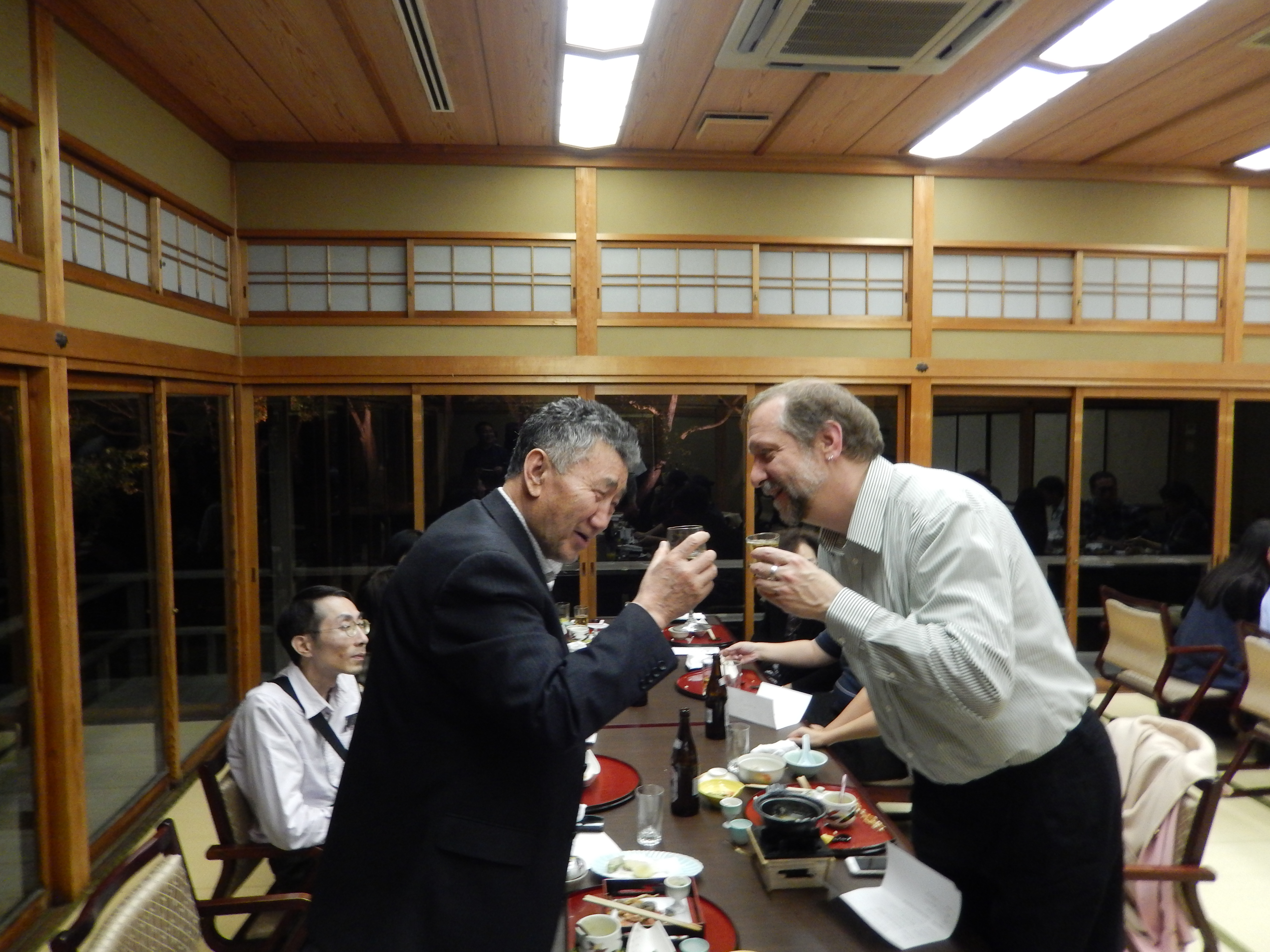
Wushour and Michael Everson toasting each other at a meeting of WG2 in Matsue, Japan in October 2015

Wushour is an expert member of the WG2 working group of the ISO/IEC JTC 1/SC 2 subcommittee for coded character sets and has attended international meetings of the working group between 1994 and 2015. He has authored a number of proposals to encode characters required for Uyghur Arabic alphabet in the Unicode Standard, as well as a proposal to encode the Old Turkic script.

In 2011, Wushour was elected as the first Uyghur academician of the Chinese Academy of Engineering (CAE).

Wushour was elected as a Xinjiang delegate to the 12th National People's Congress which was convened from 2013 to 2018.
