= Old Turkic (Unicode block) =

- Range: U+10C00..U+10C4F (80 code points)
- Plane: SMP
- Scripts: Old Turkic
- Major alphabets: Old Turkic
- Assigned: 73 code points
- Unused: 7 reserved code points

Unicode version history
- 5.2 (2009): 73 (+73)

Unicode documentation
- Code chart ∣ Web page

In Unicode, the block Old Turkic is located from U+10C00 to U+10C4F. It is used to display the Old Turkic alphabet.

Old Turkic^{[1]}^{[2]} Official Unicode Consortium code chart (PDF)
	0	1	2	3	4	5	6	7	8	9	A	B	C	D	E	F
U+10C0x	𐰀	𐰁	𐰂	𐰃	𐰄	𐰅	𐰆	𐰇	𐰈	𐰉	𐰊	𐰋	𐰌	𐰍	𐰎	𐰏
U+10C1x	𐰐	𐰑	𐰒	𐰓	𐰔	𐰕	𐰖	𐰗	𐰘	𐰙	𐰚	𐰛	𐰜	𐰝	𐰞	𐰟
U+10C2x	𐰠	𐰡	𐰢	𐰣	𐰤	𐰥	𐰦	𐰧	𐰨	𐰩	𐰪	𐰫	𐰬	𐰭	𐰮	𐰯
U+10C3x	𐰰	𐰱	𐰲	𐰳	𐰴	𐰵	𐰶	𐰷	𐰸	𐰹	𐰺	𐰻	𐰼	𐰽	𐰾	𐰿
U+10C4x	𐱀	𐱁	𐱂	𐱃	𐱄	𐱅	𐱆	𐱇	𐱈							
Notes: 1. As of Unicode version 16.0; 2. Grey areas indicate non-assigned code points

== History ==
The following Unicode-related documents record the purpose and process of defining specific characters in the Old Turkic block:

Version	Final code points (Note: Proposed code points and characters names may differ from final code points and names)	Count	L2 ID	WG2 ID	Document
5.2	U+10C00..10C48	73	L2/00-128		Bunz, Carl-Martin (2000-03-01), Scripts from the Past in Future Versions of Unicode
5.2	U+10C00..10C48	73	L2/06-392	N3164 (pdf, doc)	Silamu, Wushour (2006-08-14), Proposing to supplement with the special script and character for Uyghur Orkhun to ISO/IEC 10646
5.2	U+10C00..10C48	73		N3177	Scarborough, Benjamin (2006-09-24), Response to N3164, "PROPOSING TO SUPPLEMENT WITH THE SPECLAL SCRIP AND CHARACTER FOR Uyghur Orkhun to ISO/IEC 10646"
5.2	U+10C00..10C48	73		N3153 (pdf, doc)	Umamaheswaran, V. S. (2007-02-16), "M49.24", Unconfirmed minutes of WG 2 meeting 49 AIST, Akihabara, Tokyo, Japan; 2006-09-25/29
5.2	U+10C00..10C48	73	L2/07-216	N3258	Silamu, Wushour (2007-02-01), Proposing to Supplement with the Special Character for Uyghur Orkhun to ISO/IEC 10646
5.2	U+10C00..10C48	73	L2/07-015		Moore, Lisa (2007-02-08), "Action item 110-A100", UTC #110 Minutes, "Follow up with the authors of L2/06-392 to better understand the script that they are proposing."
5.2	U+10C00..10C48	73		N3353 (pdf, doc)	Umamaheswaran, V. S. (2007-10-10), "M51.29", Unconfirmed minutes of WG 2 meeting 51 Hanzhou, China; 2007-04-24/27
5.2	U+10C00..10C48	73	L2/07-268	N3253 (pdf, doc)	Umamaheswaran, V. S. (2007-07-26), "M50.39", Unconfirmed minutes of WG 2 meeting 50, Frankfurt-am-Main, Germany; 2007-04-24/27
5.2	U+10C00..10C48	73	L2/07-225		Moore, Lisa (2007-08-21), "C.10", UTC #112 Minutes
5.2	U+10C00..10C48	73	L2/07-305	N3299	Silamu, Wushour (2007-09-19), Proposing to Supplement with the Special Character for Uyghur Orkhun to ISO/IEC 10646
5.2	U+10C00..10C48	73	L2/07-325R	N3357R	Proposal for encoding the Old Turkic script in the SMP of the UCS, 2008-01-01
5.2	U+10C00..10C48	73	L2/08-071	N3357R2	Everson, Michael (2008-01-25), Proposal for encoding the Old Turkic script in the SMP of the UCS
5.2	U+10C00..10C48	73	L2/08-318	N3453 (pdf, doc)	Umamaheswaran, V. S. (2008-08-13), "M52.9", Unconfirmed minutes of WG 2 meeting 52
5.2	U+10C00..10C48	73	L2/08-161R2		Moore, Lisa (2008-11-05), "Old Turkic", UTC #115 Minutes
5.2	U+10C00..10C48	73	L2/08-412	N3553 (pdf, doc)	Umamaheswaran, V. S. (2008-11-05), "M53.09", Unconfirmed minutes of WG 2 meeting 53
5.2	U+10C00..10C48	73	L2/08-361		Moore, Lisa (2008-12-02), "Consensus 117-C19", UTC #117 Minutes
5.2	U+10C00..10C48	73	L2/21-153	N5164	Everson, Michael; West, Andrew (2021-08-24), Proposal to revise the glyph of one Old Turkic character [U+10C47]
5.2	U+10C00..10C48	73	L2/21-174		Anderson, Deborah; Whistler, Ken; Pournader, Roozbeh; Liang, Hai (2021-10-01), "8. Old Turkic", Recommendations to UTC #169 October 2021 on Script Proposals
5.2	U+10C00..10C48	73	L2/21-167		Cummings, Craig (2022-01-27), "Consensus 169-C4", Approved Minutes of UTC Meeting 169, "Accept glyph change for U+10C47 OLD TURKIC LETTER ORKHON OT"
