= Ahmed Mansoor =

Emirati activist

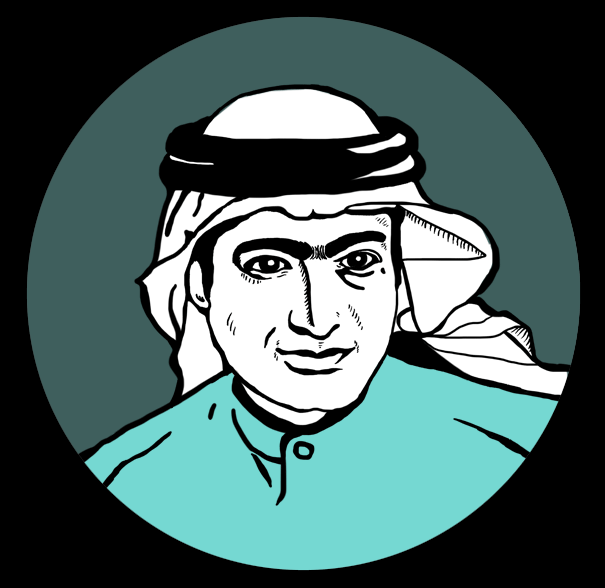
Portrait of Ahmed Mansoor Al Shehhi

Ahmed Mansoor Al Shehhi (Arabic: أحمد منصور) is an Emirati blogger, human rights and reform activist arrested in 2011 and sentenced to imprisonment for defamation and insults to the heads of state and tried in the UAE Five trial. He and the other UAE Five were pardoned by UAE's president Sheikh Khalifa bin Zayed Al Nahyan. Mansoor was arrested again in March 2017 on charges of using social media platforms to threaten public order and publish false and misleading information. He was found guilty and convicted for threatening state security and given a prison sentence of 10 years.

== Emergence ==
Mansoor was running an opposition blog calling for reforms and human rights within the United Arab Emirates. He was arrested as one of the UAE Five in April 2011 on charges of breaking UAE law of defamation by insulting heads of state, namely UAE president Khalifa bin Zayed Al Nahyan, vice president Mohammed bin Rashid Al Maktoum, and Abu Dhabi crown prince Mohammed bin Zayed Al Nahyan through running an anti-government website that express anti-government views. He was pardoned by UAE's president Sheikh Khalifa bin Zayed.

== Surveillance ==
Following his pardon, Mansoor was monitored in 2013–2014 by the UAE government using mobile phone spyware developed by the NSO Group. Around the same time he had his passport confiscated, his car stolen, his email hacked, his location tracked, his bank account emptied, and was beaten by strangers twice in the same week.

Around 2016–2017, Mansoor was targeted again by UAE contractor DarkMatter. This occurred under Project Raven, a clandestine surveillance and hacking operation targeting other governments, militants, and human rights activists critical of the UAE monarchy, which came to light in January 2019. Ahmed Mansoor was code named "Egret" in Project Raven, while another main target, Rori Donaghy, was code named "Gyro". By June 2017, Project Raven had hacked into the mobile device of Mansoor’s wife, Nadia, and given her the code name "Purple Egret".

== Second arrest ==
Mansoor was detained again in March 2017, accused of using social media platforms to "publish false and misleading information". UN human rights experts considered his arrest and imprisonment "a direct attack on the legitimate work of human rights defenders in the UAE". In March 2018, after over a year of detention, much of it in solitary confinement, he was sentenced to ten years in prison and fined 1,000,000 Emirati dirham.

In April 2019, the Human Rights Watch raised concerns over Mansoor’s deteriorating health due to his hunger strike, which he started a month back to protest against his unjust imprisonment. The organization called for his urgent release.

In June 2021, The Gulf Center for Human Rights accuses, through a complaint made in France's courts, Ahmed Naser Al-Raisi of being responsible of Mansoor's torture.

In July 2021, Human Rights Watch and Gulf Center for Human Rights raised grave concerns over the well-being of Mansoor, after his private letter detailing his mistreatment in detention and flagrantly unfair trial was published by a London-based Arabic news site. The letter revealed that since his detention in 2017, Mansoor was being held incommunicado, isolated from other prisoners, and without a bed and mattress. The UAE authorities denied him basic necessities and meaningful contact with other prisoners or family members, while keeping him in indefinite solitary confinement.

In July 2021, Mansoor was again confirmed to be one of the persons of interest of the Pegasus software, used by the UAE to spy on given targets.

On 17 September 2021, the European Union legislators urged the United Arab Emirates for an immediate and unconditional release of Ahmed Mansoor and other human rights activists. In a strongly-worded resolution, the EU stated that the Emirati authorities “violated Ahmed Mansoor’s rights for more than 10 years with arbitrary arrest and detention, death threats, physical assault, government surveillance and inhumane treatment in custody”.

On 10 July 2024, Mansoor was sentenced to 15 years in prison by the Abu Dhabi Federal Appeals Court. On 4 March 2025, the State Security Department of the Federal Supreme Court rejected appeals submitted by 53 people who were convicted in the "UAE84" case, including Ahmed Mansoor.

== Prizes ==
- In 2015, Mansoor received the Martin Ennals Award for Human Rights Defenders.

== See also ==
- DarkMatter (Emirati company)
- Hacking Team
