= Rahile Dawut =

Uyghur anthropologist

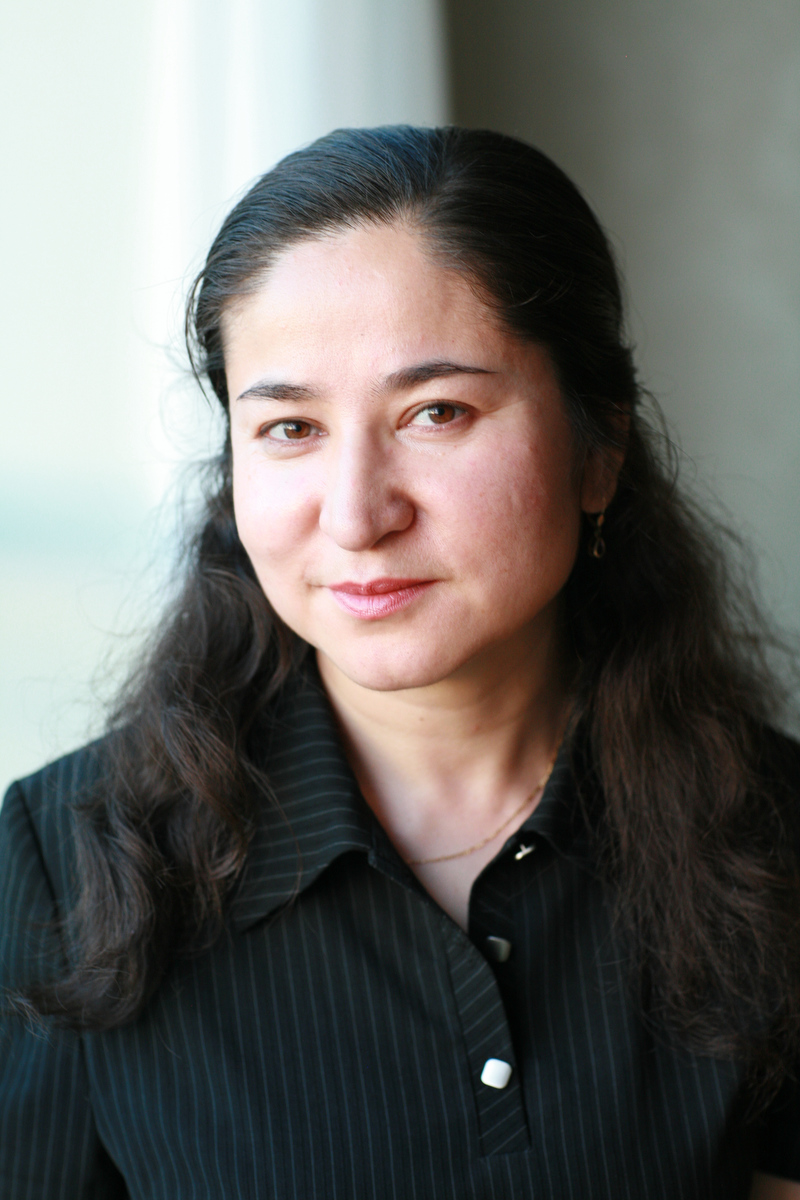
- Rahile Dawut in 2006
- Born: 20 May 1966 (age 60); Ürümqi, Xinjiang, China
- Occupation: Anthropologist
- Criminal charge: Endangering state security
- Criminal penalty: Life imprisonment

Rahile Dawut (Chinese: 热依拉·达吾提; pinyin: Rèyīlā Dáwútí; Uyghur: راھىلە داۋۇت; born 20 May 1966) is a Uyghur ethnographer known for her expertise in Uyghur folklore and traditions. Formerly a professor at Xinjiang University, where she founded the Minorities Folklore Research Centre, she was disappeared by the Chinese government in 2017 and has not been seen since.

Rahile was sentenced to life imprisonment on separatist charges in 2020.

== Early life and career ==
Rahile was born to an intellectual family in Ürümqi. In 1998, she earned her PhD at Beijing Normal University, as the first Uyghur woman to do so.

Rahile was previously a member of the Chinese Communist Party for over 30 years. After marrying, she gave birth to her daughter Akida Pulat. She pursued advanced studies in Beijing, with her parents assisting in childcare. Prior to her detention, she taught at Xinjiang University, where she founded the Minorities Folklore Research Center in 2007 and served as its director. Rahile has published a number of articles and books, and has also delivered lectures at universities internationally, including Harvard University and the University of Cambridge. Her 2002 study on religious shrines became popular among Uyghur farmers, who used it as a guide for pilgrimages. In December 2018, she was secretly tried and convicted of "splittism", resulting in a life sentence. Her appeal was subsequently rejected. Her research has been credited with preserving Uyghur cultural heritage at a time of increasing state suppression. Through her documentation of sacred sites and oral histories, Dawut helped record traditions that were otherwise at risk of disappearing under state-driven assimilation policies. Scholars noted that her work not only contributed to the field of ethnography but also served as a form of cultural resistance by affirming Uyghur identity through academic rigor.

== Disappearance, trial and jailing ==
In December 2017, Rahile reportedly told a relative of her plans to travel from Ürümqi to Beijing, after which her family and friends lost contact with her. Rahile's family and friends announced her disappearance in August 2018. By the end of 2018, it was known that she was in the hands of Chinese state authorities. According to an article in The New York Times, Rahile was one of a number of prominent intellectuals targeted as part of China's campaign to erase Uyghur identity. State authorities have not publicly disclosed Rahile's whereabouts.

Rahile's secret trial began in December 2018 in a Xinjiang court, where she was first found guilty of "endangering state security". She was reportedly jailed for life as she lost her appeal against the charges in September 2023. The Chinese Ministry of Foreign Affairs spokesperson Mao Ning said she had "no information" on the case.

Rahile's disappearance and sentencing have drawn significant international condemnation. In 2018, the Central Eurasian Studies Society expressed strong concern over her detention, highlighting her contributions to the preservation of Uyghur culture. In 2020, the Open Society University Network named her an Honorary Professor in the Humanities, acknowledging her scholarly impact. Rahile's daughter, Akida Pulat, has been actively campaigning for her mother's release, bringing attention to her case on international platforms. Human rights organizations, including PEN America, have cited Rahile's disappearance as part of broader attempts to erase Uyghur culture. The United States condemned China's reported life sentence of Rahile, calling for her immediate release. Scholars and researchers argue that Dawut's disappearance fits into a broader pattern of targeting Uyghur intellectuals and dismantling Uyghur cultural infrastructure. According to Sean R. Roberts and Joanne Smith Finley, the repression of cultural figures like Dawut is part of a campaign to erase the distinct ethnic and religious identity of the Uyghur people through state policy.

Academic institutions and advocacy groups highlighted her case in calls for greater protection of scholars at risk. In public statements and reports, organizations such as Scholars at Risk and PEN International have emphasized that Dawut's detention undermines academic freedom and violates international human rights standards.

In October 2025, United Nations' Special Rapporteurs, and Independent Experts and Working Groups expressed serious concern over the enforced disappearance of Rahile. The experts stated that Rahile's case "reflect deeply troubling patterns where cultural identity, artistic creativity, and academic work are treated as threats to national security", and "The right to freely express and participate in cultural life, without discrimination or fear, is a cornerstone of human rights."

== Awards ==
Rahile was awarded the Courage to Think Award in 2020 by Scholars at Risk. The award was collected by her daughter Akida Pulat on her behalf.

In October 2023, Michael Rosen, winner of the 2023 PEN Pinter Prize, chose Rahile Dawut as the "international writer of courage" with whom to share the award, selecting her from a shortlist of international writers "who have actively defended freedom of expression, often at risk to their own safety."

On 4 September 2024, Rahile Dawut was awarded an Honorary Fellowship and Doctor of Literature by SOAS, University of London "in recognition of her outstanding contribution to the scholarship of Uyghur cultural heritage". The citation for the fellowship was given by Prof. Rachel Harris, and the award was accepted by Rahile's daughter, Akida Pulat, by video message.

== See also ==
- Abdulqadir Jalaleddin
- Ilham Tohti
- Tashpolat Tiyip
- List of people who disappeared mysteriously (2000–present)
