= Abdulqadir Jalaleddin =

Chinese-Uyghur academic and poet

- Born: 11 March 1964 (age 62); Shufu County, Xinjiang, China
- Occupations: Professor, poet

Academic work
- Discipline: Central Asian literature
- Sub-discipline: Medieval Central Asian poetry
- Institutions: Xinjiang Normal University

Abdulqadir Jalaleddin (Uyghur: ئابدۇقادىر جالالىدىن; Chinese: 阿不都卡德尔·加拉里丁; born 11 March 1964) is a Chinese-Uyghur scholar and poet. He specializes in medieval Central Asian poetry and was working as a literature professor at Xinjiang Normal University until his disappearance in 2018. He is believed to be imprisoned in a re-education camp in Xinjiang, despite him previously expressing support for the Chinese government. By 2022, he was convicted of separatist activity and held at a regular prison.

== Disappearance ==
Radio Free Asia's Uyghur-language service were informed of Abdulqadir's disappearance and contacted police stations in Ürümqi, the city Abdulqadir worked in, but responding officials claimed they had no knowledge of his detainment. An anonymous respondent from Xinjiang Normal University's Security Department claimed that Abdulqadir had not been seen since winter vacation started, and the anonymous respondent heard that Abdulqadir had been taken for "re-education", though citing the information is not official.

The anonymous respondent then referred RFA to Feng Wenchang, the head of political affairs for Xinjiang Normal University’s Public Security Office, who checked the "list of arrested university staff" and confirmed that Urumqi State Security Police had arrested Abdulqadir on 29 January 2018. Abdulqadir's residence in Ürümqi had been raided by police on 28 January, seizing writings and electronic devices. He had initially been released, but rearrested the following day.

In the same year as his disappearance, Abdulqadir wrote an open letter in support of the Chinese government as part of a wider campaign by the latter to gather support from prominent Uyghurs. Rachel Harris of the School of Oriental and African Studies in London, a colleague of Abdulqadir who had known him for over a decade, said of him: "He was a very moderate man who always tried to give a balanced view, so much so that a lot of Uyghur nationalists accused him of selling out to the [Chinese] regime." His wife, Jemile Saqi, an associate professor at Xinjiang Normal University, was reportedly also held at a re-education camp.

Abdulqadir's exact location was unclear in 2021, though he still produced poetry from detention. He wrote the poem, "No Way Home", memorized by fellow inmates and transmitted outside, then translated by one of his former students. The poem concludes with

To the marrow of my bones I’ve ached to be with you

What road led here, why do I have no road back home

In September 2022, Chinese human rights groups reported that the Ürümqi Intermediate People's Court had sentenced Abdulqadir to 13 years imprisonment for inciting subversion of state power and ethnic separatism. He is serving his sentence at Ürümqi Prison due for release on 28 January 2031.

Abdulqadir was one of several Uyghur intellectuals who disappeared in 2018. His son and daughter, who live in the United States and Japan respectively, told RFA an NHK that they demanded the release of their father. Scholars at Risk and the World Uyghur Congress have expressed concerns about his wellbeing and called for his release.

== See also ==
- Rahile Dawut
