= Sivasubramaniam Raveendranath =

- Vice-Chancellor Sivasubramaniam Raveendranath
- Born: 22 February 1951; Sri Lanka
- Disappeared: 15 December 2006 (aged 55); Colombo, Sri Lanka
- Status: Missing for 19 years, 10 months and 14 days

Sivasubramaniam Raveendranath (born 22 February 1951) is a Sri Lankan Tamil academic and the Vice-Chancellor of the Eastern University of Sri Lanka. He disappeared after attending a conference on 15 December 2006 in a high-security zone in Colombo and was last seen leaving the conference after receiving a telephone call. His current whereabouts are unknown and his family have claimed that they believe that he has been killed.

== Disappearance ==
Raveendranath had been with the Eastern University of Sri Lanka since its inception but he had to give his resignation following threats and the kidnapping of Dean Dr. K. Balasukumar to the University Grants Commission (UGC) Chairman. However, the UGC asked him to work from the capital, Colombo. He moved to Colombo and lived there with his daughter. According to his son-in-law, M. Malaravan:

He received several threatening calls from an unknown group asking him to resign, which led to him coming to stay with his family in Dehiwala in early October this year. He informed the UGC chairman with regard to this matter. He also wrote to Defence Secretary Gotabhaya Rajapaksa about the threats to his life.

Prior to his disappearance, Raveendranath was attending the annual sessions of the Sri Lanka Association for the Advancement of Science at Vidya Mandiraya, which is situated in a high security zone in Colombo. He was last seen leaving the session after receiving a phone call.

Local media have reported that there are allegations that gunmen belonging to the paramilitary organisation Tamil Makkal Viduthalia Pulikal (TMVP) have kidnapped him.

=== Reactions ===
Amnesty International issued an appeal expressing concern

"Since he was in an area tightly controlled by the military, it seems likely that his captors are an armed group operating with the tacit support of the security forces. He is at risk of torture. He suffers from heart disease, putting his life in greater danger".

Robert J. Quinn Director Scholars at Risk Network issued an appeal to president Mahinda Rajapakse

"We are greatly concerned about his physical well being, not least because in September of this year unidentified gunmen demanding Prof. Raveendranath's resignation kidnapped the Dean of the Faculty of Arts at Eastern University, Professor Bala Sugumar, and because in the months thereafter Professor Raveendranath received repeated death threats demanding he abandon his post".

The staff of the Eastern University of Sri Lanka went on strike demanding his release.

=== Government investigation ===
The Criminal Investigation Department (CID) investigation revealed that the initial threats to him came from an armed group suspected to be the TMVP. Raveendranath's driver has been detained and it is alleged that he had received telephone calls from people "believed to be" members of the TMVP. His kidnapping is seen as part of series of abductions of Tamils and are part of the "era of terror" abductions by death squads and pro government militias which were responsible for the disappearances of thousands of people since the 1980s. Human rights watch states majority of disappearances involve Sri Lankan security forces and paramilitary groups like the TMVP led by Karuna and the government response has been inadequate.

A member of the Civil Monitoring Committee on Extra Judicial Killings, Abductions and Disappearances, Mano Ganeshan said that

that these abductions would have come to an end long time before if the police did investigations properly and added This is not new. For the last seven days three persons were abducted and nothing had happened still except for the preliminary investigations. We have taken this to the highest authorities as the families of these missing persons complained to us. If the police did their investigations courageously these abductions would have not taken place.

== See also ==
- List of people who disappeared mysteriously (2000–present)
