= Emirates Centre for Human Rights =

The Emirates Centre for Human Rights (ECHR) is a British-based non-governmental organisation that promotes the defence of human rights in the United Arab Emirates. The ECHR also engages in advocacy to “build strong relationships with media, parliaments and other relevant organisations outside the UAE” and has organised three meetings in the House of Commons of the United Kingdom in July 2012, March and July 2013.

The ECHR's website was originally registered to Malath Skahir, a former director of the Cordoba Foundation and the wife of Anas Altikriti, the current Cordoba Foundation chief executive and the key political lobbyist for the Muslim Brotherhood in Britain. Former ECHR Director Rori Donaghy says that Altikriti helped to set up the ECHR but now has nothing to do with it. As of 2015, Anas Mekdad is the director.

Current ECHR Director Anas Mekdad has made comments in favor of suicide bombings and is an outspoken supporter of Hamas. According to The Telegraph, "He is the founder of AlMakeen Network, a UK-based website which also publishes articles praising the Brotherhood, Hamas and suicide bombings."

The organisation has been quoted in the BBC, Huffington Post, and Wall Street Journal.
