= Arabic Network for Human Rights Information =

Non-governmental organization

The Arabic Network for Human Rights Information (ANHRI; Egyptian Arabic: الشبكه العربيه لمعلومات حقوق الانسان) was a non-governmental organization devoted to promoting freedom of expression across the Middle East and North Africa. It was founded in the year 2004. Based in Cairo, Egypt, the organization was founded by prominent Egyptian attorney and human rights activist Gamal Eid, who also served as the ANHRI's executive director. The ANHRI collected publications, campaigns, reports, and statements from almost 140 Arab human rights organizations across the region and republished them in a daily digest on its website. The group focused on supporting free expression, especially via the internet and mass media, and worked on behalf of persons regarded as having been detained on political grounds. It also advocated against censorship by Arab governments.

The ANHRI described its mission as follows:

Today, there are countless millions of internet users in the Middle East, but it remains difficult for users to find information about human rights. ANHRI provides a central site where Arabic readers can easily find links to and information about all human rights groups and their work in the region. The Network also focuses on and seeks the expansion of freedom of expression on the internet in the Middle East.

Above all, there are critical areas that are not only taboo intellectually in the Islamic world and culture, but for which there are also no groups in the region today to even work on, such as, the death penalty, and rights of Christian minorities. Our objective is to create a space where these issues and other vital information about human rights can be discussed freely, and where people who share an interest in these areas can create a community.

The Arabic Network for Human Rights Information was a member of the International Freedom of Expression Exchange.

In February 2008, the network opened Katib Blogs, which made it possible for those in the Arab world to obtain an Arabic-language blog that was uncensored.

In March 2008, a legal service website, Qadaya, was launched to provide a resource for journalists, researchers, and activists. The website provided information on court verdicts, important judicial cases, constitutions from various nations, and legal acts pertinent to the Arab world.

In April 2008, a website devoted to providing information on Darfur for Arab journalists and decision-makers was launched, called Ifhamdarfur. The website provides a twice-weekly newsletter and gathers Arab news reports about the Darfur crisis.

Currently, its website and reports are blocked in Saudi Arabia.

In November 2011, the ANHRI was awarded with the 2011 Human Dignity Award of the German Roland Berger Foundation.

The Associated Press reported that in January 2022, the ANHRI announced that it was closing down, blaming perceived intimidation from the Egyptian government.

== See also ==
- Alkarama
- Human Rights First Society
