= Tashpolat Tiyip =

Chinese geographer

- Born: 1958 (age 66–67); Xinjiang
- Occupation: Geographer
- Criminal charges: Separatism
- Criminal penalty: Death

Tashpolat Tiyip (Uyghur: تاشپولات تېيىپ, romanized: Tashpolat Téyip; Chinese: 塔西甫拉提・特依拜; pinyin: tǎxīfǔlātí tèyībài; born December 1958) is a Chinese geographer of Uyghur ethnicity who was president of Xinjiang University from 2010 to 2017. He was sentenced to death in a secret trial.

== Biography ==
Tashpolat enrolled at Xinjiang University in 1978 to study geography and graduated in 1983. In 1988, he went to Japan to study for a master's degree and PhD at Tokyo University of Science, where he received a Doctorate of Engineering in Applied Geography in March 1992. In 1993, he was appointed as professor in the Department of Geography at Xinjiang University. In 1996, Tashpolat was appointed Vice President of Xinjiang University and in 2010 he was promoted to President of Xinjiang University and Vice Secretary of the Communist Party at the university.

In November 2008, Tashpolat received an honorary doctorate from École pratique des hautes études.

== Arrest and trial ==
In March 2017, when Tashpolat was on the way to a conference in Germany, he was detained at Beijing airport, accused of being a "two-faced" person. After Tashpolat's arrest he was held incommunicado and he was eventually put on trial in secret on the charge of separatism. Tashpolat was found guilty and sentenced to death, suspended for two years. On 27 December 2019, the Chinese Ministry of Foreign Affairs stated Tiyip was under investigation for suspected corruption and bribery, and denied he was either tried or sentenced.
