= Al Islah (United Arab Emirates) =

- Founded: 1974
- Dissolved: 2011 (banned at federal level); 2014 (designated terrorist organization)
- Ideology: Sunni Islamism; Islamic fundamentalism Neo-Sufism; Republicanism
- International affiliation: Muslim Brotherhood

Al Islah was an Islamist political group based in the United Arab Emirates that was affiliated and considered part of the Muslim Brotherhood. The political group was banned and was designated as a terrorist group after an alleged attempt to form a military wing for a coup d'état against the government.

== History ==
Al Islah has origins in the UAE dating back to the 1960s, when Egyptian Brotherhood members fleeing Gamal Abdul Nasser's regime traveled to the Persian Gulf region. It was officially formed in 1974 when, with the approval of Dubai's ruler, Sheikh Rashid bin Saeed Al Maktoum, Egyptian teachers who were members of the Muslim Brotherhood came to work in the UAE and began to recruit young Emiratis. Ali Salem Humaid, chairman of Dubai-based think-tank, the Al Mezmaah Centre for Studies and Research, has stated that the recruited young students, "operated secretly through front organizations like mafia-style gangs, money-laundering and espionage rings." The work and activities of Al Islah have been directly linked to the Muslim Brotherhood in Egypt.

The group was supported in Ras al-Khaimah by its emirs as a way to counter Pan-Arab and Socialist popular movements and had become popular in the northern emirates of Ras al-Khaimah, Dubai, and Fujairah. The group was immensely popular among those that felt alienated by Abu Dhabi's attempt to centralize the UAE around themselves, arguing that Abu Dhabi was unequally allocating development funds at the other emirates expense. Sheikh Saeed Abdullah Salman, a member of Al Islah, became the Minister of Housing, while other Al Islah members later held the ministries of education, justice and religious affairs, and labor and social affairs.

Starting in the 1990s the ruling aristocrats of the UAE began to become wary of Al Islah influence and popular appeal and began steps to curtail its growth. Al Islah's Dubai branch was legally dissolved in 1994 after a UAE government investigation alleged it was supporting militant groups in Egypt. However, Sheikh Saqr bin Muhammad al-Qassemi supported the group claiming that Islah “played a role in preserving the youth” and did not represent a direct threat to local balances, and allowed them to continue operating in Ras al-Khaimah. The group remained a powerful force in Ras al-Khaimah, however, its support would wane, as the emirate's resistance to centralization eroded.

The implication of two Emirati nationals for involvement in the 9/11 attacks saw increased efforts by the UAE to ban the group. But the death-blow would be when Al Islah supported the pro-Democracy protests in the UAE during the Arab Spring, with the UAE's government banning the group at the federal level in 2011. Another wave of arrests were made against Al Islah members and supporters in 2013, including Sheikh Sultan bin Kayed al-Qassemi, a member of the royal family of Sharjah for allegedly supporting a foiled palace coup in Abu Dhabi in 2011, and attempting to arm themselves for their own coup against the federal government.

In 2014, the UAE designated Al Islah as a terrorist organization.

== Ideology ==
Al Islah has stated that it shares ideology with the Muslim Brotherhood in Egypt. Al Islah has attacked the UAE for the country's religious tolerance and sanctioning of community churches that have been part of the UAE since prior to the formation of the state. Since its formation, its members have promoted several measures limiting the rights of women, and sought to impose strict controls on social issues. Muslim Brotherhood member Tharwat Kherbawi said the Muslim Brotherhood finds the present UAE government to be an impediment, and the country itself to be a treasure and a crucial strategic and economic prize.

However, by the time of the Arab Spring, Al Islah also supported turning the UAE into an Arab Republic, abolishing the Emirates and doing away with the aristocratic power structures of the state. The group supported universal suffrage for resident Arabs, and an empowered elected legislature. The group was one of the leading voices during the Arab Spring for political reform in the UAE.

== Structure ==
Al Islah was a UAE-based organization that is affiliated with the Muslim Brotherhood in other countries. It had reportedly received $3.67 million in funding from a Muslim Brotherhood organization outside the UAE and coordinated activities with three Muslim Brotherhood organizations in other Arab countries. Former Al Islah member, Ali Rashid Al Noaimi, the Vice Chancellor of United Arab Emirates University, said Al Islah, "get their orders from outside," and "they are not loyal to their country."

== Alleged plans for armament ==
Al Islah has been reported to have been "secretly conducting military recruitment" that has "sought to recruit retired military officers and young Emiratis" for an alleged "coup attempt" and the "establishment of an Islamist state in the UAE". Members of Al Islah have denied reports that it has set up an "armed wing". The UAE's state prosecutor has charged members of Al Islah with "violating state security", having "links to foreign organizations" and "insulting the political leadership".

In January 2013, it was alleged that Al Islah and the Muslim Brotherhood in Egypt were undertaking efforts to infiltrate and destabilize the United Arab Emirates. In a joint police operation by Saudi Arabia and the United Arab Emirates, 11 Egyptian expatriates in the UAE were arrested on charges of "subversion, stealing state secrets" and "operating under the influence of—and sending large amounts of money to—the Egyptian Muslim Brotherhood". The men are accused of belonging to a "cell seeking to overthrow the UAE government," with the intention of "exporting the influence of Egypt's new Islamist-dominated political order".

In March 2013, a trial began in Abu Dhabi for 94 individuals linked to Al Islah for an "attempted coup". The opening day of the trial consisted of a procedural hearing, informing defendants of their rights and the charges filed against them. The hearing was attended by Emirati civil society groups and representatives of the local press. Some human rights organizations have spoken out against the secrecy of the trials. An Emirati, whose father is among the defendants, was arrested for tweeting about the trial. On 8 April 2013, he was sentenced to 10 months in jail.

On 2 July 2013, a verdict was issued in the trial of the 94 individuals. Of the 94, 56 suspects received prison sentences ranging between three and ten years. Eight suspects were sentenced in absentia to 15 years in jail and 26 were acquitted. Al Islah was subsequently dissolved.

On 7 March 2014, the Muslim Brotherhood was branded a terrorist group by the UAE government.

== Alleged resurrection attempt ==
On 2 August 2024, Emirates News Agency reported that investigations led by the Public Prosecution of United Arab Emirates had uncovered a secret organization operating outside the UAE which was actively trying to resurrect Al Islah. The new organization was formed by 2 members of Al Islah who were previously sentenced in absentia in 2013 and remain fugitive.

== See also ==
- Hassan al Diqqi, the group's co-founder
