= Prosecution of Marte Dalelv =

Legal case in the UAE

Marte Deborah Dalelv (born 1988) is a Norwegian woman, who in 2013, received a prison sentence of 16 months in Dubai, United Arab Emirates for perjury, consensual extramarital sex and alcohol consumption. Dalelv had originally reported a man to the police for an alleged rape but withdrew the rape allegation several days later, saying at that time that the intercourse had been consensual. In court she claimed she had been raped.

Dalelv's boss was jailed for 13 months for alcohol consumption and having consensual sex. Dalelv appealed the conviction and had a hearing scheduled for September 2013, but she was pardoned on 22 July, a few days after Norwegian media reported the news and after it had drawn extensive international media attention, which caused an uproar on both social media and traditional Western media outlets. Human rights activists and politicians expressed strong criticism of the Dubai justice system's handling of the incident. In Norway the criticism, as first expressed by professor in religious studies, Dag Øistein Endsjø, was mainly against the initial lack of official Norwegian reaction against what was considered a human rights violation against a Norwegian citizen. The incident occurred in March 2013 and was first reported by Norwegian media on 17 July 2013.

Dalelv had worked as an interior designer in Qatar since 2011 until this incident.

== Allegations of rape and investigation ==
=== Dalelv's account ===
Dalelv was in Dubai for a business meeting and joined colleagues from her company in Qatar for a night out on 6 March at a hotel nightclub on Sheikh Zayed Road. She reported that it was a long evening where everyone drank a lot. She asked a colleague, a Sudanese man named Hawari (alternatively reported as HM in some reports) to help her back into her room, because she was drunk. But he brought her into his room and said to her that he would sleep on the sofa and she could sleep in the bed.

In her account, she then removed her clothes except for her underwear and slept in the bed with HM on a sofa. Later she described presumably more details to the press. According to Sky News: "She said that she wanted to calm this situation down and that she sat down and wanted to drink her bottle of water and after it she wanted to go, to find her room by herself, but this was the last thing she remembered". To the day after this situation she reported, that she had woken up in the morning and realised she was being raped. She claimed she had tried to resist the man, but he pushed her head down; room-service then knocked on the door and she escaped. She stated that she had gone down to the lobby and asked the people in the lobby to call the police for her.

=== Police investigation ===
Dalelv made the initial complaint of rape early on 7 March. According to the police transcripts, she told the questioning police officer: "I had three glasses of vodka, one mojito and a beer while we were at the club, and I asked [the person] to protect me from molestation attempts". In the same account, she reported taking a cab with colleagues, including the alleged attacker, to the hotel where they were staying and that she had forgotten where her room was located. Images from the hotel's closed-circuit TV camera, which were produced in court, show Dalelv entering her colleague's room with her arm placed around his waist in one snapshot, and resting her head on his shoulder in another. Prosecution records cited Dalelv admitting she initiated the sexual activity with H.A. and he responded.

Dalelv said a medical examination seeking evidence of the alleged rape and a blood test for alcohol were taken as a standard procedure. The Dubai police forensic report confirmed the woman had had sex but there was no mention of any physical violence. She claims she was then held in custody for three days and that both her money and her passport were confiscated. After four days, she was loaned a phone card and contacted her stepfather in Norway.

=== Retraction ===
Six days later, on 12 March, Dalelv returned to the police and retracted her allegation, saying that she had made the initial complaint "because I was under the influence of alcohol". She told the public prosecutor's office, in one of the many hearings, that she had had consensual sex. According to the prosecution records, Dalelv said "I confirm that he did not rape me, but had sex with me with my consent".

In an interview with the media, she says she began to suspect that the police did not believe her story after her first interview and says she was initially advised by her manager to claim the sex was consensual in order to avoid a drawn-out court case. According to The National, an employee of her company had told her it would be a difficult case to prove, and withdrawing it would help her leave the UAE. Dalelv's employers in Qatar, Al Mana Interiors, claim the advice to retract the allegations came from the police and that her manager only translated the advice into English. Other sources quote the spokesman denying that she was advised to change her report to police. "This was not true", the spokesman said.

Dalelv reportedly regretted following that advice: "I can't blame anyone else here but me, because nobody forced me to say it. I just wish I hadn't taken that advice". In an interview with the CNN, she said "That was my biggest regret... I just thought it would all go away". She added: "I took their advice but after I left the public prosecutor's office I was crying. I felt it was almost as bad as what had happened because I had to go against everything I believed and I believed in telling the truth". When the case did go to court, she reverted to her initial allegation of having been raped.

== Sentence ==
In July 2013, the Dubai Misdemeanour Court convicted Dalelv of falsely reporting to the police that she was raped, for which they sentenced her to three months' imprisonment, and of drinking alcohol, for which they sentenced her to one month's imprisonment. The court also convicted her of having consensual extramarital sex, for which they sentenced her to 12 months imprisonment, since extramarital sex (zina) is outlawed in the UAE. Dalelv admitted to drinking alcohol, but she denied having consensual sex and making a false report to the police that she had been raped on 6 March. She appealed the conviction and had a hearing scheduled for 5 September 2013. Her advocate in court asked the court to refer the case to the public prosecution for a re-investigation into her rape claim, arguing:

[A]ccording to the forensic examiner's testimony before the court, she did not completely eliminate the probability of rape claiming that Dalelv could have been raped while she slept. Although the forensic report did not confirm any rape, the examiner's probability matched my client's claim that H.A. raped her while she slept.

Dalelv's Sudanese boss pleaded guilty and confessed to having consensual sex. He was jailed for 13 months for alcohol consumption and having consensual extramarital sex.

== Termination of work contract ==
Dalelv was fired from her job at THE One Total Home Experience in April on the ground of "unacceptable and improper behaviour during your last business trip in Dubai, which has resulted in your arrest by the Police Authorities in UAE" and "that was in direct violation of the company policy". Her colleague was also fired. The local franchise in Doha is owned by Janet Jackson's husband, Wissam al-Mana.

Officials from Norwegian colleges, including Westerdals College and the Idefag School in Tønsberg, expressed outrage at the actions of The One and indicated that they would cease cooperation with the firm in their recruitment drives.

On 21 July 2013, the company claimed they were working to secure her release, would provide legal support and that she was terminated because she "ceased communication" with them, not because of the rape allegations. The statement said:

We are sympathetic to Marte Dalelv during this very difficult situation. Al Mana Interiors has repeatedly offered Marte support and company representatives were by her side throughout the initial investigation and police interviews, and spent days at both the police station and the prosecutor's office to help win her release.

On 22 July 2013, Thomas Lundgren, head of THE One, said in an interview that it had been a mistake to fire Dalelv during the trial and that the company would offer both Dalelv and the man she accused their jobs back.

== Reactions ==
After her arrest, Dalelv initially received only "consular assistance" from the Norwegian embassy, as is usual when Norwegian citizens are charged with criminal acts abroad. The Norwegian Ministry of Foreign Affairs also "advised people to look into the legal situation of the country they travel to because what they consider innocent may be illegal in a conservative country." Her family and the Norwegian consulate negotiated her release and she took refuge at the Norwegian Seamans' Centre in Dubai.

On 18 July 2013, professor and human rights activist Dag Øistein Endsjø strongly criticized the official Norwegian reactions, slamming the Department of Foreign Affairs for their failure to understand that the incident is a human rights issue involving the right to privacy. He further criticised their silence towards the Emirate government despite the violation of the basic human rights of a Norwegian citizen, instead treating Dalelv as if she were just another Norwegian abroad being charged with a common crime. This was followed by heavy criticism by various leading opposition politicians.

The serious reaction against the Norwegian government led to an official turnaround, after which Norwegian Minister of Foreign Affairs Espen Barth Eide criticised the conviction, first saying "this is clearly in conflict with our sense of justice" and admitting that it was "problematic from a human rights perspective." The lack of initial official reactions from the Norwegian government was later criticized by the Norwegian chapter of Amnesty International. On 19 July 2013, Barth Eide finally took the same clear human rights principal position as originally argued by Endsjø: "One shall respect different cultures but not violate human rights. The right to sexual freedom and the control over one's own body are among these". Ministry of Foreign Affairs consultant Kathrine Raadim indicated that Norway would not recall its ambassador to the UAE.

The incident also caused an uproar on social media, as people were leaving comments on the Facebook pages of both the employer, THE One Total Home Experience and the Dubai Tourist Office. THE One Total Home Experience closed their Facebook page to comments from Norway, Sweden, and Denmark on 19 July 2013.

The affair also received international attention outside Norway. German news magazine Spiegel and the tabloid newspaper Bild also reported on the incident. The translated Bild headline was: "Boycott Dubai! – The world is outraged". In France and the francophone world, le Monde and le Figaro reported the affair on 20 July 2013. The BBC published an article about the incident on 20 July 2013. Euronews reported on 20 July 2013 about it in several languages. USA Today reported the incident on 18 July 2013. The New York Daily News reported the incident on 18 July 2013. The Associated Press reported the incident on 19 July 2013. Al Jazeera reported the incident on 20 July 2013. Human Rights Watch has previously focused on the UAE's poor record in dealing with sexual violence.

Anne Katrin Bang, a Middle East specialist of the Chr. Michelsen Institute, declared on 21 July 2013 that the matter will be resolved quickly, because for Dubai and the United Arab Emirates such negative worldwide media attention is completely unusual, and that they spend enormous resources on getting businesses and tourists to Dubai, so that it would be very likely that diplomacy will work in this case.

== Pardon ==
Dalelv and the Norwegian ambassador were called to a meeting with the prosecutor on 22 July. She was informed that she had been pardoned and was free to leave Dubai. The pardon came from the Sheikh Mohammed bin Rashid Al Maktoum, the Prime Minister and Vice President of the United Arab Emirates (UAE), and constitutional monarch of Dubai. By law, a pardon must be extended to all those convicted in a case, hence the man Dalelv accused of rape was also pardoned as he had never been charged with rape and both parties had been given a pardon for drinking alcohol and having sex outside of marriage. When the pardon was announced, the Norwegian ambassador to the UAE said:

We are very happy with the dialogue we have had with the UAE from the political level over the last week. We will continue to work with the UAE and we are grateful this pardon was given during Ramadan.

Marte Dalelv was back in Norway on 24 July.

== See also ==
- Alicia Gali
- Human rights in the United Arab Emirates
- Women in the United Arab Emirates
