= Human rights in the United Arab Emirates =

Human rights in the United Arab Emirates (UAE) are severely restricted. The UAE does not have democratically elected institutions and citizens do not have the right to change their government or form political parties. Activists and academics who criticize the government are detained and imprisoned, and their families are often harassed by the state security apparatus. There are reports of forced disappearances of foreign nationals and Emirati citizens, who have been abducted, illegally detained and tortured in undisclosed locations, and denied the right to a speedy trial or access to counsel during investigations by the UAE government. (Note: Attributed to multiple sources.) The non-governmental organisation (NGO) Human Rights Watch, states that Emirati laws maintain capital punishment and discriminate against women, migrants and LGBTQ individuals.

The government restricts freedom of speech and freedom of the press, and the local media are censored to prevent criticism of the government, government officials or royal families. As a result, the UAE routinely ranks near the bottom of many international indexes for human rights and press freedom.

Despite being elected to the UN Council, the UAE is not a signatory of many international human rights and labour rights treaties, including the International Covenant on Civil and Political Rights, the International Covenant on Economic, Social and Cultural Rights, and the United Nations Convention on the Protection of the Rights of All Migrant Workers and Members of Their Families.

In November 2020, the UAE overhauled its legal system and enacted a number of reforms, including lowering restrictions on alcohol consumption, permitting cohabitation, imposing harsher sentences for honor killings, and removing corporal punishment as a legal form of punishment in its penal code.

== Law and justice ==
=== Capital punishment ===
Although authorised, the death penalty is rarely applied in the UAE as the law requires that a panel of three judges agree on the decision of a sentence to death, which can be commuted if the family of the victim forgives the convict or accepts financial compensation for the crime. When a family accepts financial compensation, the court can jail a convict to a minimum of three years and a maximum of seven years.

Execution in the UAE is applied through a firing squad. Before 2020, the law included stoning as a form of punishment due to Sharia law being incorporated in the penal code; there are no reports of the sentence ever being applied.

=== Sharia law ===
Sharia is the principal source of Muslim family law. Sharia courts have exclusive jurisdiction to hear family disputes, including matters involving divorce, inheritances, child custody, child abuse and guardianship for Muslims in the UAE. All other laws are based on civil law.

The UAE penal code was updated in 2020 to remove hudud forms of punishment – which included flogging and stoning – prescribed in Sharia law, allowing only qisas (retribution) and diyas (blood money) sharia provisions. All known sentences that included flogging were issued before 2016. These were for various charges, including verbal abuse impugning sexual honour, adultery, physical abuse, alcohol consumption by Muslims, and extra-marital sex. The sentences ranged from 40 to 200 lashes. The last known stoning sentence is from 2014. All cases handed a stoning sentence were for adultery; none were ever carried out.

==== Apostasy ====
Apostasy is technically a crime punishable by death in the UAE, but there are no known prosecutions for apostasy.

==== Family law ====
The Sharia-based personal status law regulates matters such as marriage, divorce and child custody. Sharia courts have exclusive jurisdiction to hear family disputes, including matters involving divorce, inheritances, child custody, child abuse and guardianship of minors. Polygamy is legal for men, and Muslim women must receive permission from male guardian to marry and remarry, and are not allowed to marry non-Muslims. Before 2020, Sharia law was sometimes applied to non-Muslims personal status matters, but the law was changed federally to apply civil family law to non-Muslims. During this time, co-habitation was legalised and a legal process was made for children born outside of wedlock.

=== Blasphemy ===
Blasphemy of all faiths is illegal since 2015, with punishments of a 5-year prison term, a fine of five-hundred thousand to 2 million dirhams, or both; expats involved in insulting Islam are liable for deportation.

A federal law in the UAE prohibits swearing in WhatsApp and penalises swearing by a $68,061 fine and imprisonment; expats are penalised by deportation. (Note: Attributed to multiple sources.) In July 2015, an Australian expat was deported for swearing on Facebook.

=== Homosexuality and extra-marital sex ===
In 2020, the penalties for homosexuality and extra-marital sex were altered. Such activity continues to be illegal and offences are punishable by a minimum of 6-months in prison; they are not prosecuted, however, "except on the basis of a complaint from the husband or [male] legal guardian". Any penalty may be suspended if the complaint is waived. Even before this change, there were no known arrests or prosecutions for same-sex sexual activity since at least 2015, when, under the previous UAE penal code, the penalty for same-sex or extra-marital sexual activity was between one and fifteen years in prison, and prosecution could proceed at the discretion of police or other authorities.

Authorities have used "public decency" laws as a reason to punish perceived homosexual activity, such as a case in 2017 in which a man was sentenced to three months in prison for touching another man's hip at a bar, apparently in an effort to prevent a drink being spilled. Traditional interpretations of Sharia generally prescribe death as a penalty for sodomy and adultery as zina crimes; while the penal code did not prescribe capital punishment for these offences, courts were permitted to apply sharia provisions as hudud (doctrinal penalties). Article 1 of the new 2020 penal code specifically limits sharia penalties to qisas (retribution) and diyas (blood money) crimes, excluding hudud offences, for which only sentences codified in UAE law may be applied. There has never been a documented case of the death penalty being applied for homosexual activity in the UAE.

== Forced disappearances and torture ==
The UAE runs secret prisons in Yemen where prisoners are forcibly disappeared and tortured. In numerous instances, the UAE government has tortured people in custody (especially expatriate residents and political dissidents). (Note: Attributed to multiple sources.) UAE authorities are known to be using torture as a means to extract forced confessions of guilt. UAE escaped the Arab Spring; however, more than 100 Emirati activists were jailed and tortured because they sought reforms. Since 2011, the UAE government has increasingly carried out forced disappearances. (Note: Attributed to multiple sources.) Many foreign nationals and Emirati citizens have been arrested and abducted by the state. The UAE government denies these people are being held (to conceal their whereabouts), placing these people outside the protection of the law.

Human Rights Watch considers the reports of forced disappearance and torture in the UAE a grave concern. The Arab Organisation of Human Rights has obtained the testimonies of many defendants. In its report on "forced disappearance and torture in the UAE", victims give evidence that they had been kidnapped, tortured and abused in detention centres. Noted in the report are sixteen different methods of torture applied in the UAE, including severe beatings, threats of electrocution, and denying access to medical care. According to Amnesty International's 2016 annual report on Human Rights, enforced disappearance has been widely practiced in the UAE against citizens and foreign nationals. The international organisation said the UAE government has forcibly disappeared dozens of people for months in secret and unacknowledged detention for interrogation, an action commonly undertaken against people who criticised the government or its allies.

The UAE's human rights issues were discussed by activists and experts present at a conference titled "Arbitrary Detention in the US: Addressing the Crisis of Civil Society Suppression", held during the 57th session of the UN Human Rights Council. Testimonies from individuals affected by the country's legal framework were also featured at the event, where the main focus was on the challenges faced by dissenters and civil society advocates. Concerns around the UAE's human rights records, particularly regarding the "UAE84" mass trial and the suppression of dissent, were previously raised by Volker Türk. He also highlighted the cases of Mohamed al-Mansoori and Ahmed Mansoor, the activists detained for cooperating with the UN. In May 2023, the UAE was called to provide freedom to human rights defenders, but it declined suggestions to safeguard activists and journalists from reprisals.

The UAE's State Security Apparatus (SSA) was established on 10 June 1947. It is a top-level UAE authority on state security matters, which has been mainly involved in the suppression of public dissent in the Emirates. SSA has been continuously violating human rights, including forced disappearances, torture and unlawful detention. On the 50th anniversary of the SSA; MENA Rights Group, the Emirates Detainees Advocacy Center, and Human Rights Watch condemned the SSA's violations, and called upon the Emirates to stop its brutal human rights abuses and crackdown on peaceful dissent through false terrorism charges. The human rights organizations appealed the Emirati authorities to align the SSA's legal framework and operations with international human rights standards. They also urged the UAE to hold perpetrators accountable and provide remedies for victims.

In April 2009, a video tape of torture smuggled out of the UAE showed Sheikh Issa bin Zayed Al Nahyan torturing a man with whips, electric cattle prods, wooden planks with protruding nails, and running him over repeatedly with a car. In December 2009, Issa appeared in court and proclaimed his innocence. The trial ended on 10 January 2010, when Issa was cleared of the torture of Mohammed Shah Poor. Human Rights Watch criticised the trial and called on the government to establish an independent body to investigate allegations of abuse by UAE security personnel and other persons of authority. The US State Department expressed concern over the verdict and said all members of Emirati society "must stand equal before the law" and called for a careful review of the decision to "ensure that the demands of justice are fully met in this case".

=== Presidency of Interpol ===
Major General Ahmed Naser Al-Raisi, a senior UAE policeman, became a controversial candidate for the presidency of international policing body Interpol in 2021. He is alleged to have been ultimately responsible for and complicit in the torture of detainees in the UAE. He is also accused of direct involvement in the torture of two British men, Matthew Hedges and Ali Issa Ahmad. Despite international opposition, Al-Raisi was elected president of Interpol on 25 November 2021 for a four-year term.

On 1 October 2021, lawyers submitted a complaint to the French Prosecutor in Paris against Al-Raisi for the unlawful detention and torture of Hedges and Ahmad. The complaint against him was made under the principle of universal jurisdiction, allowing the French authorities to investigate and arrest foreign nationals for certain crimes, even if they occurred outside France.

On 4 November 2024, Ahmed Naser Al-Raisi visited Glasgow for the annual general assembly of the Interpol. Ahead of his arrival, Mathew Hedges and Ali Issa Ahmad, who faced extensive torture in the UAE, called for the Scottish police to follow up the case and open a separate investigation. Al-Raisi was responsible for state security services when the two British people were tortured by the Emirati police. Hedges and Ahmad submitted a criminal complaint supported with evidence to the Scottish police against Al-Raisi. The case was filed under the universal jurisdiction, enabling the country to directly take legal action against Al-Raisi.

=== Case studies ===
In 2012, Dubai police subjected three British citizens to beatings and electric shocks after arresting them on drugs charges. The British Prime Minister, David Cameron, expressed "concern" over the case and raised it with the UAE President, Sheikh Khalifa bin Zayed Al Nahyan, during his 2013 state visit to Britain. The three men were pardoned under a Ramadan amnesty three months into their jail terms and deported in July 2013, a year after first being detained.

In 2013, 94 Emirati activists were held in secret detention centres and put on trial for allegedly attempting to overthrow the government. Human rights organisations have spoken out against the secrecy of the trial. An Emirati, whose father is among the defendants, was arrested for tweeting about the trial. In April 2013, he was sentenced to 10 months in jail.

Foreign nationals subjected to forced disappearance include two Libyans and two Qataris. Amnesty reported that the Qatari men had been abducted by the UAE government and withheld information about the men's fate from their families. Among the foreign nationals detained, imprisoned and expelled is Iyad El-Baghdadi, a popular blogger and Twitter personality. He was arrested by UAE authorities, detained, imprisoned and then expelled from the country. Despite his lifetime residence in the UAE, as a Palestinian citizen, El-Baghdadi had no recourse to contest this order. He could not be deported back to the Palestinian territories, therefore he was deported to Malaysia.

In February 2015, Human Rights Watch documented a case in which three Emirati sisters, Asma, Mariam, and Al Yazzyah al-Suweidi, were forcibly disappeared by Emirates authorities. They released them without charge after they had spent three months in detention, incommunicado. The three sisters were arrested after posting comments criticising the government for arresting their brother Dr. Issa al-Suweidi. Similarly, Abdulrahman Bin Sobeih was subjected to enforced disappearance for three months by UAE authorities.

In August 2015, Emirati academic and economist Nasser bin Ghaith was forcibly disappeared by the authorities, being held incommunicado for more than 10 months. He was subjected to torture and ill-treatment. He was arrested after posting comments on social media in which he criticised the mass killing of Rab'a protesters in Cairo in 2013. He remains in prison as of 2025, after receiving a life sentence for expressing the critical views.

In November 2017, Abu Dhabi security forces arrested two journalists covering the opening of the Louvre Abu Dhabi museum for Swiss public broadcaster RTS. The journalists were held for more than 50 hours, with no ability to communicate with the outside world. According to RTS, the journalists were interrogated for up to nine hours at a time and were blindfolded as they were shuttled between different locations. Their camera, computers, hard drives and other material were confiscated.

In March 2018, an Emirati princess Latifa bint Mohammed Al Maktoum II, daughter of Sheikh Mohammed bin Rashid al-Maktoum, was seized by commandos from a yacht away from the Indian coast, after she fled from the UAE. A BBC documentary reported how the princess planned her escape from her residential palace. In a video recorded by Latifa prior to her escape, she claimed to have tried escaping from the UAE previously. However, she was captured at the border and jailed for three years; beaten and tortured. In December, a statement released by her family quoted that the princess was "safe" at her home. Since early March, the whereabouts of the princess were unknown. On 5 March 2020, a UK family court's 34-page ruling confirmed that the Sheikhas Latifa and Shamsa bint Mohammed al-Maktoum had been abducted and forcibly detained by their father and the Dubai ruler, Mohammed bin Rashid al-Maktoum.

In June 2020, it was reported that the UAE had been holding captive a Turkish aid worker Mehmet Ali Ozturk, since 2018. Reportedly, Ali Ozturk has been detained on frivolous grounds and was tortured inside UAE's prison. He was arrested in Dubai, where he, alongside his wife Emine Ozturk, was participating in Dubai's food festival. "He lost 25kg after the torture they subjected him to, from denailing to strappado. They would do these things when he refused to take part in a video accusing Erdogan of some crimes", his wife was quoted as saying. In 2017, a Yemen human rights activist Huda Al-Sarari exposed a UAE secret detention facility in Yemen where thousands of Emiratis were held and tortured. Al-Sarari was forced into exile.

On 9 July 2020, reports claimed that the UAE authorities declined requests from human rights organisations to provide information about an Omani man, Abdullah al-Shaamsi, who was sentenced to life imprisonment in May 2020 after an unfair trial. Al-Shaamsi was arrested in 2018 at the age of 19, while attending high school in the UAE. The security forces subjected him to a sustained period of detention without communication, solitary confinement and torture, leaving him with kidney cancer and depression. Despite his health conditions, he was being held in an overcrowded prison known for unsanitary conditions and lack of access to adequate health care, during the COVID-19 crisis.

In March 2021, the US State Department released a report on the human rights practices in the UAE. It highlighted that while the disappearance cases and unlawful killings were not reported to media throughout 2020, there were cases of torture, arbitrary detentions, abuses, threats of rape, and beatings. The department reported the conditions of Emirati prisons, which remained overcrowded, had poor sanitary conditions and provided no easy access to medical care, during the COVID-19 pandemic. The UAE prisons were described as extremely torturous, where prisoners were discriminated against and abused in various ways. The detainees were in most cases not provided with the details of their case for months, while many received the charges written in Arabic with no translation and forced to sign such documents.

In July 2021, a private letter written by prominent human rights defender Ahmed Mansoor, detailing his mistreatment in detention and grossly unfair trial, was published by a London-based Arabic news site. Despite having ratified the UN Convention against Torture and Other Cruel, Inhuman or Degrading Treatment or Punishment in 2012, the UAE violated the act's obligations by holding Mansoor in isolation for at least four years, amounting to physical and mental torture. On 7 January 2022, Human Rights Watch and the Gulf Centre for Human Rights issued an update on the case, reporting that Emirati authorities further penalised Mansoor after the prison letter was published. The UAE authorities held Mansoor largely incommunicado and denied him access to critical medical care. The UAE violated Mansoor's rights for many years with arbitrary arrest and detention, death threats, physical assault, government surveillance, and inhumane treatment in custody.

In September 2021, the UAE sentenced an activist from Syria, Abdul Rahman Al-Nahhas, to ten years in prison. Founder of the Insan Watch Organization, the human rights activist was charged by the Public Prosecutor of terrorism for his alleged membership in a terrorist organization as he was linked with the Switzerland-based Al-Karama Organisation for Human Rights. Al-Nahhas was also charged for insulting the prestige of the state by approaching the French embassy seeking political asylum. He was arrested at the end of 2019 and was forcibly disappeared by the UAE authorities until the commencement of his trial in January 2021. During his detention, Al-Nahhas was threatened, tortured, and was not allowed to contact his family.

== Arbitrary detention ==
Between 2015 and 2017, the United States sent a number of detainees of various nationalities, some only suspects, from Guantanamo Bay detention camp to the UAE. According to US officials, the agreement reached with UAE to accept these prisoners did not include their continued imprisonment. By 2020, nineteen remained in detention in often undisclosed locations, in harsh conditions, and with little access to outside communication. In at least one case, a detainee was sent to a facility reported by the Associated Press to be "a notorious prison rife with torture". One Afghani detainee was returned home after more than three years in UAE prisons, dying four months after his release. He recounted harsh, inhumane treatment in UAE, describing it as "mental torture".

Since October 2020, UAE authorities have, on the basis of religious background, detained, at times incommunicado, at least four Pakistani men and deported at least six others. Reports of UAE authorities arbitrarily targeting Shia residents, whether Lebanese, Iraqi, Afghan, Pakistani, or otherwise, often emerge at times of increased regional tensions.

=== Arbitrary detention cases ===
A British businessman, Ryan Cornelius was arrested at Dubai airport in 2008 and detained following disputed business dealings with the Dubai Islamic Bank (DIB). Charged with fraud in 2010, he was sentenced to 10 years in prison in 2011. Two months before his scheduled release date on this sentence, a UAE judge sentenced him to an additional 20 years, and had his assets seized, as a result of an application from the DIB. The assets forfeited under the judgement included a property development – deemed by DIB at the time as "worthless" – had an estimated value "in the billions" and was being marketed as a luxury complex. The law enabling this further penalty was applied retrospectively, having been enacted after the original trial and sentencing. Cornelius contracted tuberculosis in detention. He was subjected to human rights abuses, including aggressive interrogations in the absence of legal representation and has been subjected to prolonged solitary confinement. (Note: Attributed to multiple sources)

In June 2022, the UN Working Group on Arbitrary Detention called on the UAE to immediately release Cornelius, ruling that his continued detention violated international law. On 13 March 2025, former Leader of the Conservative Party, Iain Duncan Smith and Labour Party House of Lords member Baroness Helena Kennedy wrote to the Foreign Secretary, David Lammy. They urged the British government to take action on the long-running detention of Cornelius by instituting Magnitsky-style sanctions on Emirati officials. A group of international criminal law and human rights barristers made a similar submission to the Foreign Secretary, calling for such sanctions to be applied to Mohammed Ibrahim Al Shaibani, chairman of the board of DIB and director-general of the Dubai Ruler's Court; he is considered instrumental in extending Cornelius' detention. Al Shaibani would be banned from entering the UK and his UK assets would be frozen. The British MPs and peers requested for Cornelius' immediate release, citing his deteriorating health.

A British football coach, Billy Hood was detained by the Dubai authorities and sentenced to ten years in prison over CBD vape oil left in his car by a visiting friend. Hood suffered rough prison conditions, where he was isolated in a tiny cell. During the February 2022 visit of Prince William to the UAE for Dubai Expo 2020, Hood was "violently attacked" by four Emirati prison guards after he punched the wall of his jail cell out of "frustration". The assault against Billy Hood was completely opposite to Prince William's efforts to promote ties between the two nations.

On 28 January 2022, the Emirati authorities arrested Steve Long, a British man from Stockport, for telling airline staff he feared there was a bomb on the plane he was about to board to return home, during an apparent psychotic breakdown. Long was arrested and taken to a local hospital, where he was diagnosed with acute psychosis and delirium; the UAE's medical board determined he was not of sound mind at the time. A court in Abu Dhabi did not accept the medical evidence and Long was transferred to prison from hospital. He was ordered to pay a fine of £100,000 or he would have to serve 13 years in prison in lieu. The airline did not press any charges over the incident and, when later informed of the medical evidence, requested Long's release. His family appealed the court verdict, but it was rejected, despite two medical reports saying Long lacked capacity at the time and was not responsible for his actions. Family members believed that Long, an ambulance paramedic, and former soldier who had served tours in Iraq and Bosnia, working closely with bomb disposal units, was affected by a drone strike in Abu Dhabi in January 2022, triggering his mental collapse. Long was released more than two months later, only when the fine was paid by his family who had organised a GoFundMe campaign to raise the funds.

On 17 July 2022, the UAE authorities arrested US citizen Asim Ghafoor, the former lawyer of murdered journalist Jamal Khashoggi, and sentenced him to three years in prison. Ghafoor is also a co-founder and board member of human rights group Democracy for the Arab World Now (DAWN). The Abu Dhabi Money Laundering Court convicted Ghafoor of committing crimes of tax evasion and money laundering and also ordered him to pay a fine of more than $800,000 stemming from his conviction, in absentia. Critics and human rights defenders believe that Ghafoor's detention is politically motivated revenge for his association with Khashoggi and DAWN, which has highlighted UAE human rights abuses and war crimes. Ghafoor has stated that he had no knowledge of any legal matter against him and no reason to believe he was involved in any legal dispute in the UAE.

In August 2022, a Nigerian woman from Jos, Dinchi Lar, was detained at the airport when attempting to exit Dubai following a holiday with friends. She was arrested and charged with "breaching the privacy of government employees", stemming from an incident during Lar's arrival at Dubai airport, where she and her travelling companions were kept by immigration officials in a room for six hours without explanation. Lar recorded a video of staff yelling at the detained Nigerian passengers, uploading "a few seconds" of the video to her Twitter account. While Lar was holidaying in Dubai, the video was viewed and shared thousands of times by Nigerians. The action, which Dubai authorities charged as "sharing a video of government employees online without their consent", resulted in a sentence of one year in prison, later reduced to three months on appeal, following social media campaigns and representations from Lar's parliamentarian.

In March 2023, the UAE authorities were questioned over the arbitrary detention of around 2,400 to 2,700 Afghans, who were being held in the Emirates Humanitarian City for over 15 months. The HRW revealed that the Afghan asylum seekers were put in deteriorated living conditions, with no freedom of movement or access to legal counsel. Following the US exit from Afghanistan, a former police force colonel was evacuated to the UAE and informed that he would stay there for 14 days before being transferred to Washington. He was sent to the US in early 2024, after being held at the EHC for more than two years, where he was subjected to constant surveillance and restrictions. In 2025, the UN's Working Group on Arbitrary Detention concluded that the UAE, along with the US, was responsible for the Afghan man's arbitrary detention and violation of rights. The UN documents showed that the Emirati actions violated provisions of the Universal Declaration of Human Rights.

An American social media influencer, Tierra Young Allen was trapped in Dubai for months, after she was arrested over possible charges of "shouting" at an employee of a car rental agency she hired a car from. Allen travelled to the UAE in April 2023. The incident occurred when she went back to get her personal items from the agency, after the car met with an accident. However, she was asked to pay "an undisclosed amount of money". The car agent allegedly got aggressive and started "screaming at her". Allen shouted back at the employee, and was also followed out of the building. Shouting is technically a crime under the Emirati laws, which strictly govern speech. Speaking loudly, raising the middle finger in a dispute, or swearing in public are all considered offensive crimes. The UAE authorities held Allen's passport. Radha Stirling, who was helping Allen to depart Dubai, approached the Texas lawmakers like Senator Ted Cruz and Sheila Jackson Lee to work with the US consulate in Dubai to stop her imprisonment.

In August 2024, two brothers from Ohio, Joseph and Joshua Lorenzo, were sentenced to four months in Dubai prison over allegations of alcohol consumption, resisting arrest, assaulting an officer and damaging a patrol vehicle. Joseph Lopez is an Air Force veteran turned influencer. The brothers claimed they were drugged during a yacht party, for which they were invited by local residents. Radha Stirling said the brothers were clearly "targeted by scammers", citing they were made to pay large dinner bills. She criticized the UAE's behaviour towards tourists, saying it is not at all the "safe tourist destination" as it markets itself. The Lopez brothers sought help from U.S. lawmakers, including Republican Ohio Senator JD Vance.

In October 2024, Charles Wimberly, a US Navy veteran from Georgia, faced 3+ years of imprisonment in Dubai prison for carrying prescription medication. He travelled to the UAE on 21 September 2024 and carried CBD oil and Ibuprofen with prescription due to back injury and PTSD. He was arrested from Dubai International Airport over an allegation of "trafficking" his own prescription. A human rights advocate, Radha Sterling said it was "every tourist's nightmare". Wimberly was later released on bail but denied permission to leave the Emirates.

== Prison conditions ==
In 2019, media attention focused on the ill-treatment of an Emirati woman, Alia Abdulnoor, during her imprisonment in the UAE. While raising funds for Syrian refugees, Alia Abdulnoor was arrested in 2015 by the UAE authorities on accusations of funding terrorism. Sentenced to 10 years, she had been subjected to harsh conditions of solitary confinement, with no access to ventilation, toilet facilities, mattress, blankets, proper food or medicine. Despite being diagnosed with cancer – shortly after her arrest – she did not receive any medical treatment. Emirati authorities claim that Abdulnoor herself declined the medical treatment, while her family claims she was forced to sign documents that forbid her access to the treatment.

On 4 May 2019, Abdulnoor died in the UAE prison following prolonged mistreatment and denial of medical care by the Emirati authorities. Since her arrest, her hands and feet were shackled to her hospital bed for long periods of time. The UAE authorities ignored requests by the international rights groups, European parliamentarians, and United Nations experts to release her on the grounds of her deteriorating health.

In January 2019, the UAE police detained 26-year-old Ali Issa Ahmad for reportedly wearing a T-shirt with Qatar's flag on it after the Qatar vs Iraq AFC Asian Cup match in Abu Dhabi. Ahmad complains that FIFA "failed to protect" his human rights. Pictures of scars on Ahmad's body from the torture sustained during detention were released by the BBC. The victim complained about racial discrimination and of being stabbed and deprived of food and water while inside the prison. Complaints have been registered against FIFA as well as directed to UAE authorities through the Foreign and Commonwealth Office (FCO) and the UN Human Rights Council. According to UAE authorities, the police took Ahmad to a hospital to be examined for signs of abuse, which he complained of to the police — as is customary in cases of assault in the UAE. A medical report revealed that his injuries were inconsistent with the account of events he gave to police, and that his wounds were self-inflicted. The UAE embassy in Britain denied the news allegations that he was arrested for wearing a Qatari shirt, stating "He was categorically not arrested for wearing a Qatar football shirt". Ahmad was charged for wasting police time and filing a false report, which is an illegal act. During the AFC Asian Cup, fans were seen wearing the Qatari football shirt and waving Qatari flags without any instances of arrest.

On 10 June 2020, Human Rights Watch urged UAE authorities to take care of the mental and physical health of prisoners due to the ongoing COVID-19 outbreak in three detention facilities.

Dinchi Lar, a Nigerian tourist who was imprisoned in 2022 at Al Awir for three months, described conditions as "very demoralising, ... humiliating, ... traumatising". There was extreme overcrowding, with ten prisoners vying for three bunk beds, leaving many with no place to sleep. She reported being subject to discriminatory practices from prison guards. A racial hierarchy existed within the prison, with Lar noting differential treatment according to prisoners' race: For example, Africans being given less access to services such as medical treatment, while Arab and, especially, the "British", were more likely to be provided with such benefits.

== Freedom of speech ==
In the UAE, there is no formal commitment to free speech. It is not permitted to be in any way critical of the government, government officials, police, or the royal families. Any attempt to form a union in public and protest against any issue, will be met with severe action. Free speech restrictions apply to critics, as well as to ordinary social media users.

On 16 November 2007 Tecom stopped broadcast of two major Pakistani satellite news channels, uplinked from Dubai Media City, which was initially marketed by Tecom under the tagline "Freedom to Create". The Dubai government had ordered Tecom to shut down the popular independent Pakistani news channels Geo News and ARY One World on the demand of Pakistan's military regime led by General Pervez Musharraf. This was implemented by Du Samacom disabling their SDI and ASI streams. Later, policy makers in Dubai permitted these channels to air their entertainment programs, but news, current affairs and political analysis were forbidden. Although subsequently the conditions were removed, marked differences have since been observed in their coverage. This incident has had a serious impact on all organisations in the media city with Geo TV and ARY OneWorld considering relocation.

During the 2017 Qatar diplomatic crisis, Hamad Saif al-Shamsi, the Attorney-General of the United Arab Emirates announced on 7 June that publishing expressions of sympathy towards Qatar through social media, or in any type of written, visual or verbal form is considered illegal under UAE's Federal Penal Code and the Federal law on Combating Information Technology Crimes. Violators face between 3 and 15 years imprisonment, a fine of up to 500,000 Emirati dirhams ($136,000) or both.

In December 2019, US intelligence identified that the UAE, which banned VoIP options on several applications, developed its own messaging and video calling app ToTok and has been using it as a spying tool. The country had forbidden the calling options on applications like WhatsApp, FaceTime and Skype, prompting suspicion over the self-developed app.

In April 2020, authorities in the United Arab Emirates introduced criminal penalties for the spread of misinformation and rumours related to the COVID-19 pandemic in the United Arab Emirates.

The UAE launched repressive campaigns in 2024 to suppress voices opposing its policies and legal decisions. Both Emirati nationals and expats, who opposed Israeli crimes or the Abraham Accords over their social media posts, were arrested and summoned. A Jordanian national of Palestinian descent and a contract employee in Dubai, "K. H." was summoned for interrogation on 10 April 2024 by Abu Dhabi State Security Service over a Facebook post condemning Israel's genocidal assault on Gaza. He was imprisoned for three days, denied legal representation, and forced to leave the UAE. On 25 March 2024, an Egyptian national was also interrogated by the UAE security officials over social media posts, in which he criticized Arab and Islamic negligence to the famine eruption in Gaza during Ramadan, and called for an end to normalization of ties with Israel. After being questioned for several hours, he was fired from his job, and was given 48 hours to leave the Emirates.

The Abu Dhabi Federal Court of Appeal sentenced 43 activists to life imprisonment, after convicting them of creating and managing a terrorist organisation. The Emirati authorities imprisoned ten other defendants for 10 to 15 years on the charges of money laundering and "co-operating with al-Islah". The court acquitted one defendant and dismissed 24 cases. Nasser bin Ghaith, Abdulsalam Darwish al-Marzouqi and Sultan Bin Kayed al-Qasimi were among those who were sentenced to life imprisonment, while Ahmed Mansoor was also among the defendants. Devin Kenney, Gulf Researcher for Amnesty International, called upon the UAE to "urgently revoke this unlawful verdict" and immediately release those sentenced. He called the trial a shameless parody of justice, which violated multiple fundamental principles of law. GCHR founder, Khalid Ibrahim also said that "it is a real tragedy" that the human rights defenders will be kept in prison for decades.

On 26 June 2025, the UAE sentenced 24 defendants to life imprisonment, following a case related to terrorism charges and based on a fundamentally unfair mass trial. The verdict overturned a prior judgement to dismiss the case. It was the UAE's second-largest mass trial, bringing the total number of convictions in mass trial from 53 to 83. HRW condemned the judgement of life imprisonment for peaceful activism, calling it "Abu Dhabi's utter contempt for both peaceful criticism and the rule of law".

During the 2026 Iran War, the UAE made it illegal to share images or videos of strikes in the UAE. By April 2026, at least 35 people were arrested for posting footage on social media while over 100 people were arrested for filming. At the same time, the UAE government posted false and misleading content that sought to downplay the impacts of strikes.

=== Transnational sensitivity and influence ===
In July 2024, the UAE sentenced 57 Bangladeshi individuals to 10-year prison sentences or life sentences for protesting against their home government in Bangladesh.

The UAE's history of not allowing human rights campaigners, who acted against the Emirates, was questioned. In 2022, an investigative journalist, Maggie Michael, who reported on Emirati secret detention centres in Yemen, was blocked by the UAE to join the UN committee focused on Yemen as a regional expert. A Canadian researcher Shawn Blore, who published research on the UAE's illicit gold trade, was also barred from serving as a UN expert on a committee working around the exploitation of minerals in the DRC. In the same year, the UAE authorities banned a British national, Dinesh Mahtani, from continuing his trip to the Emirates over security concerns. Mahtani was on the UN panel of experts that were monitoring sanctions on Al-Shabaab, which was being funded through the coal shipments from Somalia to the Emirates. The UAE was alleged of using similar tactics to deny its support to the RSF in the Sudan war, where it was supplying weapons and drones in the name of humanitarian aid.

Human Rights Watch reported that on 15 March 2017, Tayseer Najjar, a Jordanian journalist, was sentenced to a three-year prison term and a fine of 500,000 UAE Dirhams by Abu Dhabi Federal Appeals Court. He had been charged with insulting the state's symbols and criticising Egypt, Israel and Gulf countries through comments he made on Facebook during Israeli military operations in Gaza in 2014, before he moved to the UAE. Ten days after preventing his travel to Jordan for a visit to his wife and children on 3 December 2015, UAE authorities summoned al-Najjar to a police station in Abu Dhabi and detained him. They also blocked contact with a lawyer for more than a year before bringing him to trial in January 2017. Najjar was set to be released on 13 December 2018, after completing a three-year prison sentence. However, his sentence was extended for another six months as he failed to pay the substantial fine. Human Rights Watch and Reporters Without Borders urged Anwar Gargash, the UAE minister of state for foreign affairs, for an immediate release of the journalist. Sarah Leah Whitson, Director of Human Rights Watch said, "If the UAE were truly committed to its rhetoric of tolerance, it would not have ripped Najjar away from his wife and children for years-old innocuous Facebook posts."

For criticising Jordanian authorities and state corruption, the Jordanian activist Ahmed al-Atoum was arrested in Аbu Dhаbi in May 2020, detained incommunicado, and held in solitary confinement for four months before being sentenced to prison in October 2020. The court convicted him solely on the basis of his Facebook posts criticising the Jordanian royal family and government, handing al-Atoum a 10-year prison sentence. Calls from human rights groups for al-Atoum's immediate release, including from the UN Working Group on Arbitrary Detention, went unheeded and he remained in al-Wathba prison in the UАЕ, until his mother's death on 10 February 2024.

The UAE requested extradition of an Egyptian activist Abdulrahman al-Qaradawi, who was arrested in Lebanon in December 2024 on his return from Syria after celebrating the fall of Bashar al-Assad's regime. Al-Qaradawi is a vocal critic of the UAE and son of late spiritual leader of the Muslim Brotherhood, Yusuf al-Qaradawi. His arrest was based on an Egyptian arrest warrant, following a ruling that sentenced him in absentia to five years in prison on charges of "opposing the state and inciting terrorism". The UAE requested his extradition following a video in which al-Qaradawi called for the ousting of "shameful Arab regimes" and "Zionist Arabs" like "the UAE, Saudi Arabia and Egypt". The Emirates had no extradition treaty with Lebanon. Al-Qaradawi's attorney, Mohammad Sablouh gave account of some "suspicious" activities around his client's case, and said his extradition to the UAE was unlawful. There were concerns that if extradited to the Emirates, al-Qaradawi could be subjected to torture. (Note: Attributed to multiple sources.) Amnesty International also urged the Lebanese authorities to reject al-Qaradawi's extradition request by the Emirates.

On 8 January 2025, Lebanon's Cabinet extradited Egyptian activist Abdulrahman Yusuf al-Qaradawi to the UAE using a private jet provided by Royal Jet LLC. Al-Qaradawi was immediately detained and subjected to forcible disappearance. In March 2025, the UN human rights experts called for the UAE to disclose his whereabouts, after over 90 days of enforced disappearance and solitary confinement. In April 2025, al-Qaradawi's lawyer Rodney Dixon filed a legal challenge against the UAE authorities in the UK, calling it an "abduction in plain sight". The complaint demanded the British authorities to open an investigation under their universal jurisdiction laws against the UAE Ministry of Interior, Lebanese Prime Minister Najib Mikati and Royal Jet LLC.

In April 2025, over 30 human rights groups called on the UK and the EU to act on behalf of Abdulrahman al-Qaradawi, alleging that his case involves transnational repression, where states coordinate to suppress dissent beyond their borders. Amnesty International, PEN International and many other human rights groups signed the letter as a collaborative effort. Human Rights groups labeled his detention an "enforced disappearance", and UN human rights experts also demanded his whereabouts to be disclosed. Qaradawi's lawyer Rodney Dixon said it is happening in the UAE, which claims itself to be a champion of tolerance and coexistence. In August 2025, 28 human rights organizations released a joint statement expressing concerns over the case of al-Qaradawi, following over 200 days of his enforced disappearance. They called for the UAE authorities to reveal his whereabouts and immediately release him. The rights organizations also urged the Emirates to ensure al-Qaradawi's physical and mental safety, while also giving him access to choose his legal counsel.

=== Global responses ===
On 16 September 2021, in a strongly worded resolution, European Union legislators condemned alleged human rights violations in the UAE and urged the government to free several prominent human rights activists and other "peaceful dissidents" imprisoned in the country.

On 11 May 2020, a US-based gulf rights group, Americans for Democracy and Human Rights in Bahrain in its report said that "impunity in the United Arab Emirates is endemic." Their study documented tactics used by Emirati authorities to stifle dissidents, besides revealing use of torture against those recognised as imminent threat to national security. "This 'threat' most commonly includes human rights defenders, political opposition, religious figures, and journalists," a statement from the report read. In June 2020, International Campaign for Freedom in the UAE (ICFUAE) informed that the UAE continues to detain human rights activists who demanded democratic reform in the country. The campaign group stated Fahad al-Hijri, Abdallah Ali Alhajery, Oman Alharethy and Mahmoud Alhoseny, all have completed their sentences, but continued to remain imprisoned.

On 3 July 2024, HRW called upon the UAE allies, including the US, UK, and EU, to voice concerns regarding the unfair mass trial of at least 84 political dissidents and human rights defenders. They also urged the observers to attend the verdict session on 10 July 2024. Joey Shea, UAE researcher at HRW, called it the second largest unfair mass trial in the UAE's history, for which the international communities failed to raise concerns. She appealed the Emirati allies to urge for the activists' immediate and unconditional release, meeting with their families, to send trial monitors, and to publicly condemn the unfair trial. She said the Emirates had been circumventing backlash for its human rights records by using its economic and security relationships.

PEN International raised concerns regarding the imprisonment of Emirati human rights activists, Ahmed Mansoor and Dr. Mohammed al-Roken. The organization criticized the UAE for violating the international human rights standards and freedom of expression. An Emirati lawyer and academic, Dr. Mohammed al-Roken, was also among the dissidents tried in the "UAE 94" case, imprisoned in July 2012 for 10 years over peaceful activism. PEN International, along with over 50 non-governmental organizations and international figures, called upon the UAE authorities for the immediate and unconditional release of Mansoor, al-Roken, and other prisoners of conscience. The appeal highlighted the UAE's broader repression against peaceful dissent.

==== Around COP28 ====
Human rights advocates were pushing the UK government to attain guarantee from the UAE that Britishers attending the COP28 summit should not face arrests if they protest. They wrote a letter to James Cleverly calling for him to ask for an undertaking from the UAE assuring the security and rights of the UK citizens travelling to the UAE for COP28. The human right activist said dissidents are often arrested in the country, and protests against the Emirati government are crushed. In April 2023, COP28 organizers asked the speakers attending the summit to not protest against the UAE laws.

In August 2023, Human Rights Watch urged Emirati authorities to release all those detained unlawfully before the COP28 event. The UAE continued to detain people who had already completed their prison sentences, including the 55 dissidents, lawyers and others convicted in mass trial of the "UAE94" case. The "UAE94" detainees covered a majority of those held in prison beyond their sentences. The UAE was called to release the imprisoned human rights activist, Ahmed Mansoor, who was being held in prolonged solitary confinement since his arrest in March 2017. NGOs such as Human Rights Watch demanded the immediate release of other rights defenders, Dr Nasser bin Ghaith, Amina Al Abdouli and Maryam Al Balushi. HRW also called on the UAE to end the human rights violations, including monitoring through sophisticated surveillance, use of repressive laws to imprison human rights defenders, denying the right to freedom of expression, denying right to peaceful assembly, and denying the right to form union to the migrant workers.

=== Nasser bin Ghaith ===
In March 2017, UAE's prominent economist, academic and human rights defender Dr Nasser bin Ghaith was arrested and imprisoned for 10 years, for his comments on Twitter related to the treatment he received during his previous arrest. About his previous detention, Amnesty International stated that the trial, where he and four other Emiratis prosecuted on charges of publicly insulting the countries' leaders over comments posted online, was not a fair one. He was forcibly disappeared, held in secret detention for months, and subjected to beatings and deliberate sleep deprivation. Nasser bin Ghaith was sentenced to 10 years in jail by the Federal Appeal Court in Abu Dhabi. The later arrest was for again posting false information on Twitter about UAE leaders and their policies. Amnesty International condemned and criticised the arrest, asking for his immediate release. Ghaith went on a hunger strike in October 2018; his health has been deteriorating since then. He was denied access to a lawyer during his trial period.

=== Ahmed Mansoor ===
Also in 2017, prominent human rights defender Ahmed Mansoor was arrested at 3:15am by ten male and two female uniformed security officials according to an Amnesty International report. The security personnel raided the family's apartment, carried out a lengthy room-by-room search, including of the children's bedroom, and confiscated electronic devices. Mansoor was detained for the peaceful expression of conscientiously held belief.

According to Amnesty International, Israeli company NSO Group's Pegasus spyware was used to target human rights activist Ahmed Mansoor. Citizen Lab's August 2016 report, "The Million Dollar Dissident", documents the attempts made to infect Mansoor's phone with Pegasus spyware. On 20 March 2020, Amnesty International and the Gulf Centre for Human Rights wrote a joint-letter and called for the immediate and unconditional release of rights activist Ahmed Mansoor. The groups also called the UAE as an "incubator of tolerance".

As the international committee was about to get together in Dubai for the COP28 climate summit, Amnesty International's Deputy Director for the Middle East and North Africa, Aya Majzoub, urged the world leaders to pressurize the UAE to release Mansoor, who remained unjustly persecuted and detained for 6 years. The rights group said the global community should publicly condemn the injustice and push the UAE to immediately release Mansoor, ahead of COP28.

=== The Najjars ===
Hussain al-Najjar has served an 11-year prison sentence; he is one of a number of prisoners convicted in 2013 following the grossly unfair mass trial of 94 government critics and reform advocates. Accordingly, on 17 March 2014, the activist Osama al-Najjar who is a 28-year-old son of Hussain, was sentenced to three years in prison after sending tweets to the Minister of Interior expressing concern about his father who had been ill-treated in jail. During the detention, he was denied access to a lawyer for over six months and held in solitary confinement at a secret detention facility for four days after his arrest.

=== Other incidents ===
In 2013, the UAE arrested five men, including an American citizen for making a satirical video. The American, who had moved to Dubai for work, was sentenced to a year in prison.

Andrew Ross, a professor at New York University was not allowed to enter the UAE (where the university has a campus), after he had commented on the treatment of workers who built the campus there. Airline staff at the airport informed him that the UAE authorities told them that they will refuse him entry.

Alaa al-Siddiq, a UAE dissident and critic of the Kingdom of Saudi Arabia, allegedly died in a car crash in Oxfordshire, South East England. However, campaigners and a close colleague of Siddiq's have demanded the British police thoroughly investigate the incident, claiming that the activist's "life was at risk all the time", Khalid Ibrahim, executive-director of the GCHR. Al-Siddiq was a human rights activist, who had been fighting for the release of her father Mohammad al-Siddiq, also an activist, detained since 2013. According to Mr Ibrahim, threat to the life of Al Siddiq heightened since her commencing work for the Saudi human rights firm, ALQST. Other passengers in the BMW car, two adults and a child, received injuries and were taken to the hospital for treatment.

In August 2022, a Nigerian woman, Dinchi Lar, was detained at the airport when attempting to exit Dubai following a holiday there with friends. She was arrested and charged with "breaching the privacy of government employees", stemming from an incident during Lar's arrival at Dubai airport, where she and her travelling companions were kept by immigration officials in a room for six hours without explanation. Lar used her phone to record staff yelling at the detained Nigerian passengers, uploading "a few seconds" of the video to her Twitter account. Having eventually been permitted entry following the delay, Lar continued with her holiday plans in Dubai. At the same time, her uploaded video was viewed and shared thousands of times by Nigerians. The action, which Dubai authorities charged as "sharing a video of government employees online without their consent", resulted in a sentence of one year in prison, later reduced to three months on appeal.

During the 2026 Iranian missile and drone attacks on the United Arab Emirates, authorities imposed strict restrictions on filming and sharing footage of the incidents. According to international media reports, several individuals, including foreign nationals, were arrested or charged for recording or disseminating videos of the strikes. Authorities also accused some tourists and journalists of "spreading panic" for sharing footage of the damage. Reports indicated that penalties for violations included fines, detention, or deportation.

=== Internet ===
In 2012, a cybercrime decree was issued, imposing severe restrictions on freedom of speech in social networking, blogs, text messages and emails. The law outlawed criticism of senior officials and demands for political reform. The law stipulates an imprisonment and a fine of up to 1,000,000 dirhams for publishing information which is deemed to be critical towards the state.

In 2015, a man was detained for commenting on his employer's Facebook page after a disagreement with his employer, even though the posts were made while the man was in the United States. Police in Abu Dhabi contacted him after he came back to the UAE and asked him to meet officers at a police station, where he was later detained.

Secret Dubai was an independent blog in Dubai, from 2002 until 2010. It generated a significant following in the Middle East Blogosphere until the UAE's Telecoms Regulatory Authority (TRA) in the UAE blocked the website.

In July 2016, Americans for Democracy and Human Rights in Bahrain released a report accusing the UAE government of enacting further laws to restrict the freedom of political and social expression. According to the organisation, Federal Law No. 12 of 2016 inhibits social and political resistance, by constraining an individual's right to privacy and the right to freedom of expression. ADHR also said counter terrorism Laws in UAE are used to legalise arbitrary arrests, detainment, prosecution and imprisonment of peaceful protestors and government critics.

In 2018, Internet service providers in UAE blocked all VoIP apps, but permitting "government-approved VoIP apps (C'ME and BOTIM)". In opposition, a petition on Change.org garnered over 5000 signatures, in response to which the website was blocked in UAE.

In July 2023, a social media influencer, Hamdan Al Rind, was detained by the UAE over a TikTok video. Rind, also referred to as "Car Expert", was seen tossing stacks of cash at the employees inside a luxury car showroom in the TikTok video, and offered to buy the most expensive car. The video made fun of Dubai's luxurious lifestyle, but the video was alleged of promoting "a wrong and offensive mental image of Emirati citizens and ridicules them". Rind was alleged of "abusing the internet" through a "propaganda that stirs up the public opinion and harms the public interest". The UAE's cybercrime laws extensively restrict expression and assembly, and criminalize any form of opposition of the country and its leaders.

== Freedom of religion ==
In the 2010s, a large number of Shia Muslim expatriates were deported from the UAE. Lebanese Shia families have been deported for their alleged sympathy for Hezbollah. (Note: Attributed to multiple sources.) According to some organisations, more than 4,000 Shia expats have been deported from the UAE.

Persecution of Uyghurs in China, and the lack of religious freedom there, has led to Uyghur Muslims fleeing the country to take refuge in other parts of the world. Diplomatic influence from Beijing has resulted in the abuse and detention of Uyghur Muslims even abroad. The government of UAE was one of three Arab and Muslim-majority nations – with Egypt and Saudi Arabia – to have deported Uyghur Muslims back to China. Uyghurs living in asylum in Dubai have been detained by UAE authorities, before being returned to China. Media (including Sky News; Middle East Eye) and human rights groups (Euro-Med Human Rights Monitor, for example) report that Uyghurs living in third world countries have been lured to Dubai, and that the UAE maintains "black sites" there, where Uyghurs travelling to the UAE are detained incommunicado, interrogated and forcibly removed to China. China and the UAE have no extradition agreement shared between them. (Note: Attributed to multiple sources)

== Women's rights ==
The United Arab Emirates ratified the Convention on the Elimination of All Forms of Discrimination Against Women (CEDAW) in 2004. This Convention regards violence against women as a form of discrimination and calls on participating governments to put measures in place to combat violence in all forms, be it domestic or public. The UAE regularly participates in and hosts international and GCC conferences on women's issues. The UAE has signed several other international treaties on protecting the rights of women. Among these are the Convention on the Rights of a Child, the Hours of Work (Industry) Convention, the Equal Remuneration Convention, the Conventions Concerning Employment of Women During the Night and the Minimum Age Convention.

The 2015 United Nations Development Programme (UNDP) status report on Millennium Development Goals noted that the state legislations in the UAE do not discriminate on the basis of gender with respect to education, employment or the quality of services provided.

Through several initiatives women in the UAE are playing an increasingly important role in the economy, politics and technology and are viewed by some as leaders of gender equality in the Gulf region.

There is an alternative for women to dissolve their marriage found under article 110 of the Personal Status Code, or khul', however this means a woman relinquishes her right to the mahr – or the dowry she received as part of the marriage contract.

As to custody of children, women are considered physical guardians, they have the right to custody up to the age of 13 for girls and 11 for boys. If a woman chooses to remarry, unless the court decides it's in the best interests of the child, she forfeits her right to custody of her children. Current laws gives custody of children to the parent who is capable and appropriate for their upbringing. Under article 71, women who leave their husbands can be ordered to return to their marital home.

In November 2021, a report by The Independent highlighted the lack of fundamental protection of women's rights in the UAE. British politicians — Sir Peter Bottomley, Debbie Abrahams and Helena Kennedy — generated a report based on the testimony of British women who experienced the UAE legal system. On the other side of the many reforms and PR experts laundering efforts, the Emirati laws still leave women vulnerable to serious abuses of their rights, with little legal recourse.

=== Violence against women ===
==== Domestic violence ====
In one case the Federal Court sanctioned a husband's beating of his wife so long as he did not leave physical marks and does so lightly, and in another case a man was ordered to pay a compensation for taking it too far by leaving physical injuries on his beaten wife.

Furthermore, there is growing concern at the UAE's lack of action against domestic violence. Human Rights Watch has documented three cases where it was alleged that police discouraged UK nationals from reporting cases of domestic violence.

On 24 March 2022, a senior British judge concluded that Sheikh Mohammed bin Rashid al-Maktoum inflicted 'exorbitant' domestic abuse on his ex-wife Princess Haya bint Hussein. Princess Haya was awarded the sole responsibility for their children by the High Court in London, in regards to their medical care and schooling. Sheikh Maktoum was barred from taking any decisions about the children's lives and from having any direct contact with them. The court said that Sheikh Maktoum's "coercive and controlling" behaviour could only have been "most harmful to the emotional and psychological welfare" of their children. As per the previous hearings, he spied on his second wife and her legal team by ordering their phones to be hacked using the Pegasus spyware.

In 2024, an Irish woman was detained and had her passport destroyed following a suicide attempt after allegedly experiencing domestic violence. She was charged with attempted suicide and alcohol consumption following the suicide attempt, and temporarily had a travel ban imposed on her, which was lifted following the Irish government's intervention in the case.

==== Legislation on Domestic Violence ====
The UAE enacted Federal Decree-Law No. 13 of 2024 on the Protection from Domestic Violence, replacing the previous Law No. 10 of 2019. The new legislation broadens the definition of domestic violence to encompass physical, psychological, sexual, and economic harm, extending protection to a wide range of family members, including spouses, children, relatives, and individuals under guardianship. The law introduces stricter penalties for offenders, such as imprisonment, fines, and mandatory rehabilitation programs, with enhanced sanctions for repeat offenses and crimes against vulnerable individuals. It also establishes mandatory reporting obligations, restraining orders, victim shelters, and specialized protections for children affected by domestic violence. Beyond criminal penalties, the legislation provides mechanisms for reconciliation, comprehensive victim support services, public awareness campaigns, and professional training for relevant authorities.

The NGO Human Rights Watch welcomed the UAE's new legislation, recognizing it as an step toward strengthening women's rights.

==== Sexual assault and harassment ====
Women subjected to sexual assault crimes face several obstacles in seeking justice. They often face zina charges if they report a crime committed against them. Alicia Gali was imprisoned for eight months for sex outside of marriage after reporting an assault by her co-workers. A Norwegian woman was jailed for 16 months for reporting a rape before being pardoned and returned home. However, police said she was imprisoned for filling a false case as she had withdrawn her complaint.

The credibility of the victim's allegations are called into question by the police and Courts will enquire as to whether alcohol was involved, whether the alleged perpetrator was known, and whether the victim resisted the attack.

=== Migrant workers ===
According to the International Labour Organization there are 146,000 female migrant domestic workers employed in the UAE. In 2014 a Human Rights Watch report spoke to domestic workers who complained about abuse and not being paid due earnings, getting rest periods or days off and excessive workloads as well as some documented cases of psychological, physical and sexual abuse.

The kafala system ties a migrant worker to their employers, who act as their sponsors and makes it difficult for them to change employers. If a domestic worker attempts to leave her sponsor before the end of her contract without her sponsor's approval she will be deemed to have "absconded" which usually results in fines and deportation. However, the government has changed the law since then.

Federal law No.8 excludes domestic workers from labour laws and the environment in which they work is not regulated by the Ministry of Labour. This means domestic migrant workers have fewer rights than other migrant workers. In 2012, the government stated that the cabinet had approved a bill on domestic workers, however, Human Rights Watch has received no response to requests to obtain a draft.

In January 2016, Amnesty international said the UAE government continues to violate rights of migrant workers in the country. The international organisation said workers have been tied with Kafalah system and denied collective bargaining rights. Amnesty also said that women workers from Asia and Africa are explicitly excluded from labour law protections and particularly vulnerable to serious abuses, including forced labour and human trafficking.

In March 2019, the Human Rights Watch reported that eight Lebanese nationals have been detained by the Emirati authorities on the accusations of terrorism charges, without any evidence. The defendants have been held in prolonged solitary confinement in an unknown location for more than a year, without any access to lawyers and family members. The detainees have also been forced to sign on blank papers while some of them were blindfolded.

In January 2020, Emirati employers were reported to have been hiring Indian migrant workers on tourist visas, exploiting them and leaving them helpless with illegal status. Recruiters in the UAE chose visit visas because they are cheaper and easier to obtain than work permits.

=== Employment ===
Women's employment in the labour market has risen significantly and in the public sector women make up 66% of employees, with 30% of them in high level positions of responsibility.

The UAE cabinet is made up of 27.5% women, all of whom play key roles in supporting innovation in the country with results indicating that the UAE is a new hub for women in technology. Women represent 50 percent of scientists in STEM programmes at UAE universities and female nationals in the nuclear sector have tripled between 2014 and 2015.

=== Political affairs ===
In 2004 the first woman was appointed as minister, Lubna Al Qasimi. In 2006, in the first parliamentary elections, the first woman was elected to the National Federal Council and in 2016, Noura Al Kaabi was named Minister of state for the NFC. Reem Al Hashimi and Shamma Al Mazrui are two other female ministers.

The UAE was the second Gulf country that has permitted women to hold the position of a judge or prosecutor, with Bahrain in 2006 being the first in the region to appoint a female judge.

=== Abortion ===
Abortion in the United Arab Emirates is only legal in cases of rape, incest, if the continuity of the pregnancy would endanger the woman's life, the foetus' deformation is proven, or after approval of a regulatory committee. A 2011 report by Gulf News found that the illegality and inaccessibility of abortion resulted in women purchasing cheap ulcer medication to end unwanted pregnancies, which failed in 15–20% of cases and often resulted in extensive bleeding and, in rare cases, death. There have been several instances of arrests of women procuring abortions, including rape victims.

=== Education ===
Education has been a prime area of growth in the whole Gulf region. Primary school completion rates have grown by 15% for girls. The UAE, along with Qatar, has the highest female-to-male ratio of university enrolments worldwide, with 77% of Emirati women enrolling in higher education after secondary school; women make up 70% of all university graduates in the UAE.

Traditionally women were encouraged to pursue perceived "female disciplines" such as education and healthcare. There are increasing numbers of women entering areas such as technology and engineering, with women being 56% of graduates in science, technology, engineering and mathematics (STEM) from UAE government universities.

By 2014, the UAE had four women fighter pilots and thirty females trained in the nation's special security forces. In September 2014, the UAE opened the region's first military college for women, Khawla bint Al Azwar Military School.

== Migrant and labour rights ==
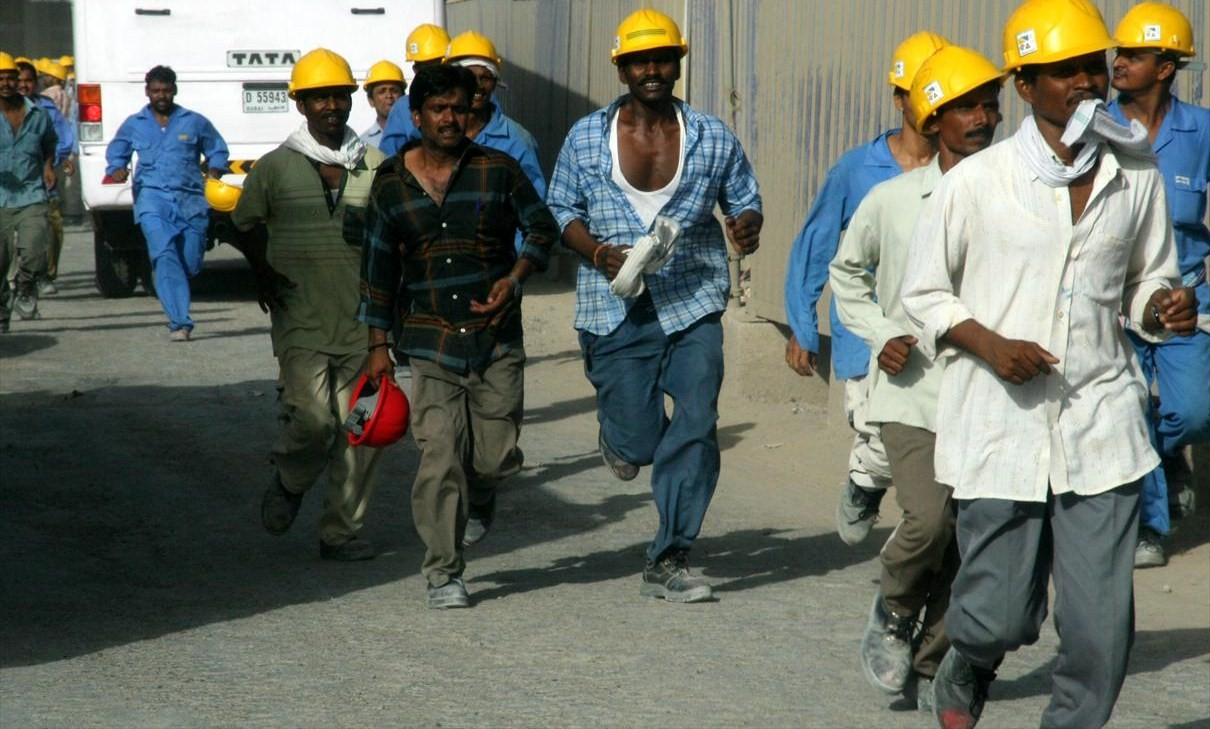
Construction workers at the Burj Dubai

Migrants, particularly migrant workers, make up a majority (approximately 80%) of the resident population of the UAE, and account for 90% of its workforce. They generally lack rights associated with citizenship and face a variety of restrictions on their rights as workers. There are reports of undocumented Emiratis who, because of their inability to be recognised as full citizens, receive no government benefits and have no labour rights. These stateless Emiratis – also known as bidun – either migrated to the UAE before independence or were natives who failed to register as citizens. In addition, there are various incidents where local individuals have ill-treated people from overseas, just on the basis of nationality or race.

A number of UAE's royals have been charged for abusing and ill-treating servants in overseas countries.

Emiratis receive preferential treatment in employment via the Emiratisation programme forcing companies by law to limit the number of migrant workers in a company. This is done for the purposes of stabilising the labour market and protecting the rights of this group as a minority in their own country. At the same time, however, due to the welfare benefits of the UAE government, many Emiratis are reluctant to take up low paying jobs especially those in the private sector; private sector employers are also generally more inclined to hire overseas temporary workers as they are cheaper and can be retrenched for various reasons, for example, if they go on strike. (Note: Attributed to multiple sources.) Most UAE locals also prefer government jobs and consider private sector jobs to be below them.

Indian migrants constitute 42.5% of the UAE's workforce and have reportedly been subject to a range of human rights abuses. Workers have sometimes arrived in debt to recruitment agents from home countries and upon arrival were made to sign a new contract in English or Arabic that pays them less than had originally been agreed, although this is illegal under UAE law. Further to this, some categories of workers have had their passports withheld by their employers. This practice, although illegal, is to ensure that workers do not abscond or leave the country on un-permitted trips. In 2012, a workers' camp in Sonapur, Dubai, had their water cut for 20 days and electricity for 10 days, as well as no pay for three months. They were told that they had been forewarned that the lease was about to expire, and their option was to go to the Sharjah camp, which the workers did not want to do because it was "very dirty and [had] a foul smell.

- In September 2003 the government was criticised by Human Rights Watch for its inaction in addressing the discrimination against Asian workers in the emirate.
- In 2004, the United States Department of State has cited widespread instances of blue collar labour abuse in the general context of the United Arab Emirates.
- The BBC reported in September 2004 that "local newspapers often carry stories of construction workers allegedly not being paid for months on end. They are not allowed to move jobs and if they leave the country to go home they will almost certainly lose the money they say they are owed. The names of the construction companies concerned are not published in the newspapers for fear of offending the often powerful individuals who own them."
- In December 2005 the Indian consulate in Dubai submitted a report to the Government of India detailing labour problems faced by Indian expatriates in the emirate. The report highlighted delayed payment of wages, substitution of employment contracts, premature termination of services and excessive working hours as being some of the challenges faced by Indian workers in the city. The consulate also reported that 109 Indian blue collar workers committed suicide in the UAE in 2006.
- In March 2006, NPR reported that workers "typically live eight to a room, sending home a portion of their wage to their families, whom they don't see for years at a time." Others report that their wage has been withheld to pay back loans, making them little more than indentured servants.
- In 2007, the falling dollar meant workers were unable to service debts and the incidence of suicides among Indian workers had reportedly been on the increase.

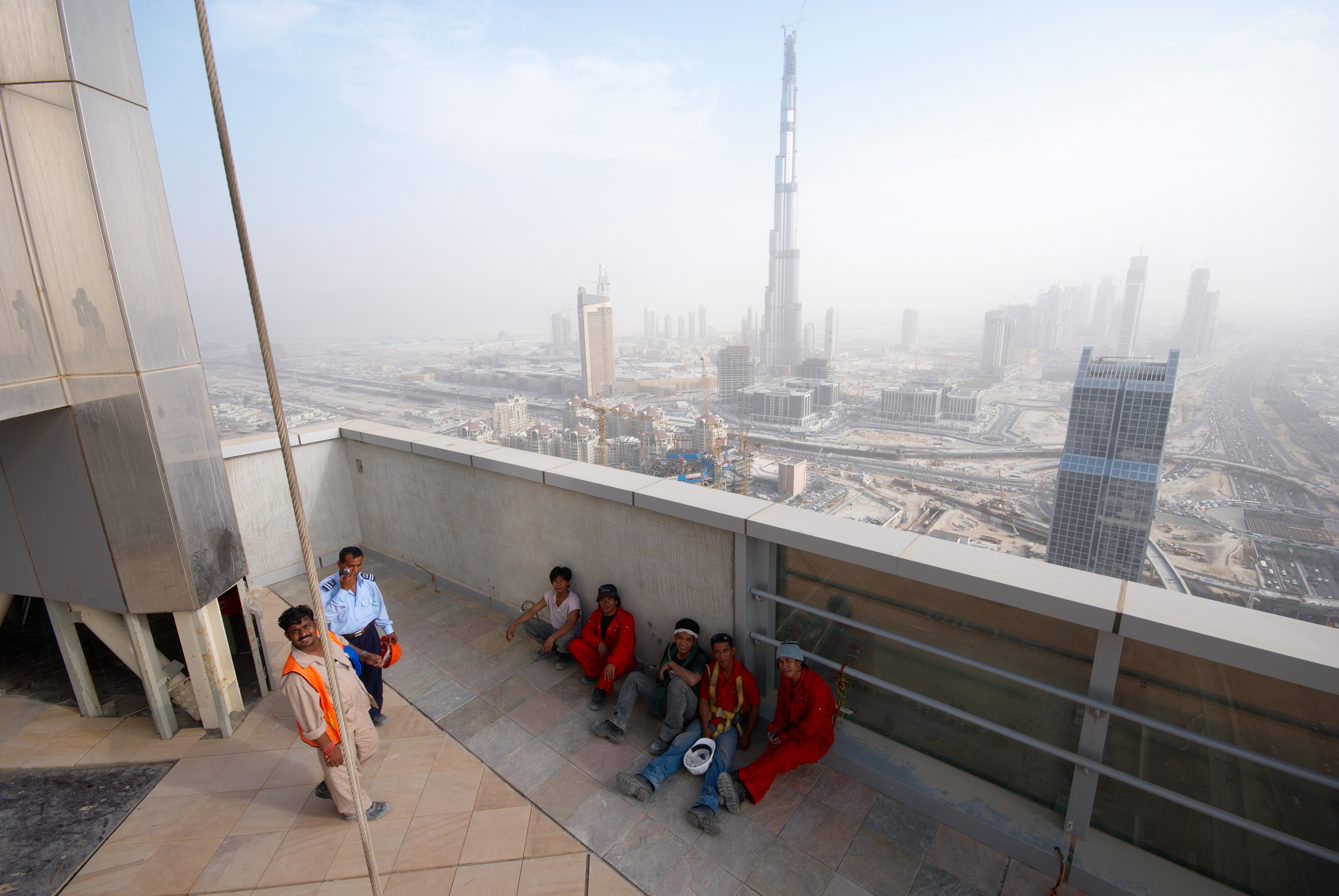
Construction workers from Asia on top floor of the Angsana Tower

- Human Rights Watch reported issues during construction of Louvre Abu Dhabi museum including the confiscation of workers passports resulting in forced labour conditions. High "recruitment loans" paid by migrant workers to construction companies still had not been repaid as of 2019, according to government-paid monitors. 86% of these fees were over $2000.
- In October 2020, Dubai witnessed a spike in number of homeless migrant workers. Blue collar workers from Asia and Africa claimed that they were trapped in the city after losing jobs, as the economy tightened due to COVID-19. Reports stated that many migrants gathered in the parks, as they were left abandoned with no money. It was also suggested that migrant workers from poorer countries were paid low wages, worked for long hours and often lived in cramped dormitories that were seen as coronavirus hotbeds in the UAE.
- In October 2023, a report based on evidence obtained by FairSquare revealed that migrant workers from Africa and Asia were working in very hot weather and humidity for the COP28 conference facilities. In September 2023, they were exposed to extreme temperatures, hitting 42 °C (108 °F), despite a "midday ban", forbidding work in unsheltered areas between 12:30pm and 3:00pm. The ban applies 15 June – 15 September every year.

=== Worker disputes in 2006 and 2007 ===
On 21 March 2006, tensions boiled over at the construction site of the Burj Khalifa, as workers upset over low wages and poor working conditions rioted, damaging cars, offices, computers, and construction tools. A Dubai Interior Ministry official said the rioters caused approximately US$1 million in damage. On 22 March most workers returned to the construction site but refused to work. Workers building a new terminal at Dubai International Airport went on strike in sympathy.

A strike by foreign workers took place in October 2007, resulting in 159 deportations.

=== Government action ===
In the past, the UAE government has denied any kind of labour injustices and has stated that the accusations by Human Rights Watch were misguided. Towards the end of March 2006, the government announced steps to allow construction unions. UAE labour minister Ali al-Kaabi said, "Laborers will be allowed to form unions."

The strikes and negative media attention provided exposure of this regional problem and in 2008 the UAE government decreed and implemented a "midday break" during summer for construction companies, ensuring laborers were provided several hours to escape the summer heat. Illegal visa overstayers were assured amnesty and even repatriated to their home countries at the expense of friends, embassies or charities.

In July 2013, a video was uploaded onto YouTube, which depicted a local driver hitting an expatriate worker, following a road related incident. Using part of his headgear, the local driver whips the expatriate and also pushes him around, before other passers-by intervene. A few days later, Dubai Police announced that both the local driver and the person who filmed the video, had been arrested. It was also revealed that the local driver was a senior UAE government official, although the exact government department is not known. The video once again brings into question the way that lower classes of foreign workers are treated. Police in November 2013 also arrested a US citizen and some UAE citizens, in connection with a YouTube parody video which allegedly portrayed Dubai in bad light. The parody video was shot in areas of Satwa and depicted gangs learning how to fight using simple weapons, including shoes, the aghal, etc. During the UN Universal Periodic Review (UPR) Pre-session of 2017 addressing the human rights violation affairs, a UAE delegate, Ahmed Awad, departed from the session after pronouncing it as a "waste of time".

A report released by the Human Rights Watch in November 2020 cited that hundreds of Sudanese migrant workers were tricked into fighting alongside the UAE-backed forces loyal to General Khalifa Haftar in the Libyan civil war. The Sudanese men were hired as security guards by an Emirati firm, Black Shield Security Services, to work at malls and hotels in the UAE.

=== Labour law issues ===
The UAE has four main types of labour laws:

- Federal Labour Law – Applies to all the seven Emirates and supersedes free zone laws in certain areas.
- JAFZA Labour Law – Applies to the Dubai Jebel Ali Free Zone.
- TECOM Labour Law – Applies to all Dubai Technology and Media Free Zone properties: Internet City, Media City, Studio City and International Media Production Zone.
- DIFC Labour Law – Applies to all companies in the Dubai International Financial Centre free zone.

Labour laws generally favour the employer and are less focused on the rights of employees. The Ministry of Labour is criticised for loosely enforcing these laws, most notably late or no wage or overtime payment for both blue collar and white collar employees.

=== Employee "gratuity" ===
A gratuity (Arabic: مكافأة) is a lump-sum payment given to an employee by the employer or hiring company in the UAE and Dubai at the end of employment tenure. Per Emirates' Labor Law, employers are liable to disburse gratuity benefits to their workers upon exceeding one year of service. Companies incorporated within UAE, be it mainland or free zones, are bound to comply with the provisions of Labour Law (Federal Law number 8 of 1980) which is further regulated through Ministry of the Human Resources and Emiratisation (MoHRE).

End-of-service benefits is an extensive topic; there are a variety of benefits available, of which the gratuity obligation is the biggest proportion. Considering the multiple terms and conditions attached to calculating gratuity, the benefit is technical and complex to understand and administer.

== Human trafficking and prostitution ==
According to the Ansar Burney Trust (ABT), an illegal sex industry thrives in the emirates, where a large number of the workers are victims of human trafficking and sexual exploitation, especially in Dubai. This complements the tourism and hospitality industry, a major part of Dubai's economy.

Prostitution, though illegal by law, is conspicuously present in the emirate because of an economy that is largely based on tourism and trade. There is a high demand for women from Europe and Asia. According to the World Sex Guide, a website catering to sex tourists, Eastern European are the most common prostitutes, while Eastern European prostitutes are part of a well-organised trans-Oceanic prostitution network. The government has been trying to curb prostitution. In March 2007, it was reported that the UAE had deported over 4,300 sex workers, mainly from Dubai.

The UAE government enshrines conservative values in its constitution and therefore has adopted significant measures to combat this regional problem. The government of the UAE has worked with law enforcement officials to build capacity and awareness through holding training workshops and implementing monitoring systems to report human rights violations. Despite this, the system led to registration of only ten human-trafficking related cases in 2007 and half as many penalised convictions.

Businesses participating in exploiting women and conducting illegal activities have licenses revoked and operations are forced to close. In 2007, after just one year, the efforts led to prosecution of prostitution cases rose by 30 percent. A year later, an annual report on the UAE's progress on human trafficking measures was issued and campaigns to raise public awareness of the issue are also planned. Internationally, the UAE has led various efforts in combating human trafficking, particularly with the main countries of origin. The state has signed numerous bilateral agreements meant to regulate the labour being sent abroad by ensuring transactions are conducted by labour ministries and not profiting recruitment agencies.

In 2020, International United Nations Watch released a report on trafficking to the Middle East from Europe. The documentation highlighted multiple patterns of trafficking and made a mention of how the number of Moldovan women and girls are being trafficked to the UAE. It also said that although the UAE has anti-trafficking measures in place, Dubai continues to be the "amusement park of the Arabian Peninsula".

=== Child camel jockeys ===
A 2004 HBO documentary accuses UAE citizens of illegally using child jockeys in camel racing, where they are subjected also to physical and sexual abuse. Anti-Slavery International has documented similar allegations.

The practice is officially banned in the UAE since 2002. The UAE was the first to ban the use of children under 15 as jockeys in the popular local sport of camel-racing when Sheikh Hamdan bin Zayed Al Nahyan, UAE's Deputy Prime Minister and Minister of State for Foreign Affairs announced the ban on 29 July 2002.

Announcing the ban, Sheikh Hamdan made it very clear that "no-one would be permitted to ride camels in camel-races unless they had a minimum weight of 45 kg (99 lb), and are not less than 15 years old, as stated in their passports". He said a medical committee would examine each candidate to be a jockey to check that the age stated in their passport was correct and that the candidate was medically fit. Sheikh Hamdan said all owners of camel racing stables would be responsible for returning children under 15 to their home countries. He also announced the introduction of a series of penalties for those breaking the new rules. For a first offence, a fine of 20,000 AED was to be imposed. For a second offence, the offender would be banned from participating in camel races for a period of a year, while for the third and subsequent offence, terms of imprisonment would be imposed.

The Ansar Burney Trust, which was featured heavily in the HBO documentary, announced in 2005 that the government of the UAE began actively enforcing a ban on child camel jockeys, and that the issue "may finally be resolved".

=== Victim support ===
Special funds to provide support for victims have been created such as Dubai's Foundation for the Protection of Women and Children, Abu Dhabi's Social Support Centre, the Abu Dhabi Shelter for Victims of Human Trafficking and the UAE Red Crescent Authority. Services offered include counseling, schooling, recreational facilities, psychological support and shelter. Mainly women and children receive assistance and in certain cases are even repatriated to their home countries.

== See also ==
- Human rights in Dubai
- Communications in the United Arab Emirates
- Emirates Centre for Human Rights
- Human rights in Islamic countries
- United Arab Emirates Anti-Discrimination Law
- Sex trafficking in Dubai
