= Women in the United Arab Emirates =

General statistics
- Maternal mortality (per 100,000): 3 (2017)
- Women in parliament: 50% (2020)
- Women over 25 with secondary education: 78.2% (2018)
- Women in labour force: 43.5% (2011)

Gender Inequality Index
- Value: 0.049 (2021)
- Rank: 11th out of 191

Global Gender Gap Index
- Value: 0.717 (2022)
- Rank: 68th out of 146

According to Human Rights Watch, there is substantial discrimination against women in the United Arab Emirates. The status of women has improved over the years. UAE performs better on metrics of gender equality than many other states in the Gulf region, and it has been making reforms to protect women's rights and empower women in different sectors. Some critics argue that these reforms have limited impact in practice.

The Human Rights Watch (HRW) released a report in 2021 confirming that the UAE needs to put more effort into improving women's status in the UAE and achieving progress on women's rights. Emirati women live under male guardianship. Whereas men can marry multiple women and unilaterally divorce, women are required to obtain a court order to divorce their husband. Honor killings can go unpunished, as the victim's family can pardon the murderer. Marital rape is not criminalized in the UAE. The UAE is a major destination for sex trafficking.

Female members of the royal family have been subjects of abuse and restrictions by the male royalty. On 5 March 2020, a British court ruled that on the balance of probabilities, Sheikh Mohammed, the absolute ruler of Dubai and the prime minister of the UAE, had abducted two of his daughters, Shamsa and Latifa, and had threatened his former wife, the Jordanian princess Haya bint Hussein. Allegedly, Shamsa and Latifa were forcibly medicated while held in Dubai under Sheikh Mohammed's orders since 2000 and 2018, respectively. On 16 February 2021, BBC's Panorama broadcast a documentary featuring Sheikha Latifa's video messages that she made secretly under enforced detention in Dubai on the orders of Sheikh Mohammed.

== History ==
The role of women in society in the lands which comprised modern-day UAE has gradually expanded since the discovery of oil. Before 1960, there were few opportunities for them outside the realm of home and family. In the early 1990s, there were five women's societies promoting various issues of importance to women, including literacy and health.

In 2002, the government created an official business networking system for women in order to overcome the lack of networking between them. There are currently 12,000 members with over $6.81 billion (USD) in investment capital. In its 2015 assessment, The CEDAW Committee made many recommendations to the UAE on initiatives needed to safeguard women's equality. The CEDAW Committee is a group of impartial specialists that oversees the application of the Convention on the Elimination of All Forms of Discrimination Against Women, consisting of 23 international specialists on women's rights. Therefore, the UAE took action in response by including the removal of laws that required women to "obey" their husbands, the explicit affirmation of a man's legal right to discipline his wife and children, and the punishment of consensual extramarital sex. These laws forbid discrimination based on gender or sex.

== Employment ==
As of 2006, less than 20% of Emirati women were part of the national labor force. The UAE, according to a 2012 report by the International Monetary Fund (IMF), has the second lowest percentage of local women working in the Gulf Cooperation Council (GCC). In 2008–2009, only 21% of Emirati women were part of the labor force. The UAE has the highest percentage of total female labor participation in the GCC (including expatriate women). In 2018, women constituted 28% of the total Emirati workforce, with 489 thousand women employed in the UAE. In 2019, 521 thousand women were employed in the UAE. The rate of female participation in the labor force in 2019 was 52.4% and rose to 57.5% in 2020 but is still lower than male participation, which was 92% in 2020.

In the UAE, women cover roughly 66% of jobs in the public sector. This is the highest proportion worldwide, and 30% of them are in senior leadership positions.

At the nine-year-old Abu Dhabi Securities Exchange, women constitute 43% of its investors while the city's businesswomen's association boasts 14,000 members. At the forefront of Emirati women in business is Sheikha Lubna bint Khalid bin Sultan al Qasimi, appointed Minister for Economy and Planning in November 2004 and subsequently promoted to her current post as Minister of Foreign Trade. Sheikha Lubna holds the distinction of being the first woman to hold a ministerial post in the country. Her efforts have led her to be rated within the Forbes Magazine's 100 Most Powerful Women.

On July 27, 2025 Dubai Police Force made history, as it appointed Colonel Samira Abdullah Al Ali to be the first ever female brigadier.

== Women's rights and gender equality ==
Discrimination against women persists in the UAE. In the mid-2010s, YouTuber Hayla Ghazal used comedy to draw attention to gender disparities in the UAE and beyond.

Women's rights in the UAE came under heightened scrutiny after the emergence of videos of Sheikha Latifa, daughter of Dubai ruler Mohammed bin Rashid Al Maktoum, claiming she feared for her life as she was held hostage by her father since she tried to flee in 2018.

In 2019, the UAE came under fire for handing all its Gender Balance Index awards, which applaud efforts to reduce the gender gap within the government and promote equal opportunities, to men – these include the Best Personality Supporting Gender Balance, Best Federal Authority Supporting Gender Balance, and Best Gender Balance Initiative.

In the United Nations Development Program's 2020 Gender Inequality Index (GII), the UAE ranked first in the Gulf region and 18th out of 162 countries for gender equality after having ranked 26th globally in 2019. The World Economic Forum also ranked the UAE in 2020 second-best in the Middle East and North African (MENA) region for gender equality. In the World Economic Forum's annual Global Gender Gap Report, the UAE ranked 72 out of 153 countries in 2021, rising from 120 in 2020.

The Human Rights Watch (HRW) submitted on February 26, 2021, to the United Nations committee a report on the UAE's compliance with the Convention on the Elimination of All Forms of Discrimination Against Women (CEDAW). The report addressed articles 1, 2, 3, 6, 11, 12, 14, 15, and 16 of the CEDAW and it was founded on information covered in media reports and HRW publications, including "'I Already Bought you': Abuse and Exploitation of Female Migrant Domestic Workers in the United Arab Emirates" (Oct, 2014). In November 2021, Sir Peter Bottomley MP, Debbie Abrahams MP, and Helena Kennedy produced a report which revealed the facts around the lack of fundamental protection of women's rights in the UAE. The report named "Fact-Finding Report into the Treatment of British Women in the United Arab Emirates" showcased the stories of British women who have been falsely accused and left vulnerable to serious abuses of their rights by Emirati law.

== Domestic workers ==
Since the 1980s, the UAE has seen an increase in female migrants occupying roles of domestic workers. Generally, most domestic workers in the UAE are South Asian migrants, mainly from India, Indonesia, and the Philippines. However, recent trends have shown a rise in female domestic workers from Ethiopia and Kenya. On Oct. 22, 2014, the Human Rights Watch (HRW) published a 79-page report on the abuse of female domestic workers in the UAE. The report sheds light on the range of abuses against migrant domestic workers by UAE employers and recruiting agents. This includes the confiscation of passports, trafficking, physical abuse, failure to pay full wages, forcing workers to labor for long hours without time off, and the denial of proper living conditions and access to healthcare services. The Human Rights Watch said that Emirati law failed to protect the rights of domestic workers and left them exposed to abuse.

== Law ==
Women are unequal to men under the UAE law. Article 72 of the Law on Personal Status allows judges to determine if it is permissible for a married woman to leave the house and to work. Unlike the case of children of Emirati fathers, Emirati citizenship is not transmitted automatically to the children of Emirati women.

Some Emirati laws have been amended in women's favor. In 2016, the clause in Article 53.1 of the Penal Code recognizing that a husband has the right to discipline his wife was removed. Also, a line in Article 56.1 of the Law on Personal Status stating that a husband has the right to courteous obedience from his wife was removed in 2019. In 2020, Article 334 of the Penal Code punishing honor killings by a little as one month in jail was annulled. However, families of honor killing victims can waive their right to have the murderer punished in return for blood money (or none) in which case the murderer will be punished by 7 years.

Under Article 9 (1) of the Federal Decree-Law No. 10 of 2019 concerning Protection from Domestic Violence, anyone found guilty of domestic violence will face a maximum of six months in prison and/or a fine of up to Dh5,000 (about $1361). The law covers physical, emotional, sexual, and economic abuse.

Some of the women's rights under the Personal Status Law require the consent of a male guardian, who is often the husband or a male family member.

In Sep. 2020, the updated UAE Labour Law 8/1980 took effect, requiring equal pay for men and women who perform the same work or work of equal value. Under Emirati law, women are free to choose their jobs, although employers can ask for permission from a male guardian.

Pregnant women working in the private sector are entitled to 45 paid scheduled days of maternity leave. After returning to work, the Emirati law allows mothers an extra hour off per day for breastfeeding.

The UAE amended in Nov. 2020 Article 356 of the Penal Code, removing language that was used to punish consensual sex outside of marriage, but marriage certificates continue to be a requirement for obtaining birth certificates, which may affect migrant women and leave their children undocumented.

Women in the UAE are free to own property and acquire a mortgage, and a third (30%) of all Dubai real estate is owned by women.

=== UAE Gender Balance Council ===
The UAE Gender Balance Council was founded in 2015 to implement the UAE's gender balance agenda. It is tasked with reducing the gender gap across all government sectors, improve the UAE's performance in global competitiveness reports on gender equality, achieving gender balance in decision-making positions, and launching initiatives that aim to improve gender balance across the UAE.

== Business ==
The UAE ranked first in the Middle East and North Africa (MENA) region in the economic participation of women in the World Bank's 2021 'Women, Business and the Law' report. The country also announced on March 15, 2021, a list of companies that must have at least one female board member, but by May 2021, only four of the 23 people holding these roles at firms on the UAE's two major stock exchanges were women. Fatma Hussain, for example, is the only female on the board of Dubai-based Aramex PJSC. But since the decision came to effect in early April, Emaar Properties PJSC, Du, Abu Dhabi National Oil Company for Distribution, and Dana Gas named women to their boards. Even with the new rules being made, gender inequality is still a major problem in our lives today. Women struggle with wage gaps, getting promotions, and even underrepresentation in positions, which can impact their careers as women in the business industry.

=== Businesswomen councils ===
The UAE established, under the auspices of the Federal Chamber of Commerce, a group of businesswomen's councils to support businesswomen and female entrepreneurs in the country. A number of organizations have the stated intent to empower women in business, such as the Abu Dhabi Business Women Council, the Sharjah Business Women Council (SBWC), the Dubai Business Women Council (DBWC), the Ajman Business Women Council (AJBWC), and the Arab Women Leadership Forum.

== Flogging and stoning ==
The UAE's judicial system is derived from the civil law system and Sharia law. The court system consists of civil courts and Sharia courts. According to Human Rights Watch, UAE's civil and criminal courts apply elements of Sharia law, codified into its criminal code and family law, in a way that discriminates against women.

Women in UAE can be victims of flogging. Flogging and stoning were legal judicial punishments in the UAE because of the Sharia courts. Flogging is used in UAE as a punishment for several criminal offences, such as adultery, premarital sex, and prostitution. Stoning was removed as a legal punishment in 2020. In most emirates, floggings are frequent with sentences ranging from 80 to 200 lashes. Between 2007 and 2013, many women were sentenced to 100 lashes. Moreover, in 2010 and 2012, several Muslims were sentenced to 80 lashes for alcohol consumption. Under UAE law, premarital sex is punishable by 100 lashes.

Stoning is a legal form of judicial punishment in UAE though sentences are overturned on appeal. In 2006, an expatriate was sentenced to death by stoning for committing adultery. Between 2009 and 2013, several people were sentenced to death by stoning. In May 2014, an Asian woman was sentenced to death by stoning in Abu Dhabi.

Sharia law dictates the personal status law, which regulate matters such as marriage, divorce, and child custody. The Sharia-based personal status law is applied to Muslims and sometimes non-Muslims. Non-Muslim expatriates are liable to Sharia rulings on marriage, divorce, and child custody. Sharia courts have exclusive jurisdiction to hear family disputes, including matters involving divorce, inheritances, child custody, child abuse and guardianship of minors. Sharia courts may also hear appeals of certain criminal cases including rape, robbery, driving under the influence of alcohol and related crimes.

== Politics and government ==
Within the public sector, governmental employment for Emirati women has increased from 11.6% in 1995 to 22% in 2005 and 66% as of June 2007. In September 2008, Dr. Hissa Al Otaiba and Najla Al Qasimi became the UAE's first female ambassadors, serving Spain and Sweden respectively.

The representation of women in the Federal National Council was raised in Dec. 2018 to 50%, and about 30% of the Cabinet of the UAE is female. Nine out of the 33 Cabinet members are women, and these are: Minister of Culture and Youth Noura bint Mohammed Al Kaabi, Minister of State for International Cooperation Reem bint Ibrahim Al Hashimy, Minister of Community Development Hessa bint Eisa Bu Humaid, Minister of State for Public Education Jameela bint Salem Al Muhairi, Minister of State Dr. Maitha bint Salem Al Shamsi, Minister of State for Food and Water Security Mariam Al Mheiri, Minister of State for Advanced Technology Sara Al Amiri, Minister of State for Government Development and the Future Ohood bint Khalfan Al Roumi, and Minister of State for Youth Affairs Shamma bint Sohail Faris Al Mazrui. In December 2019, the UAE became the only Arab country, and one of only five countries in the world, to attain gender parity in a national legislative body, with its lower house 50 per cent women.

The UAE became the second Arab country with a female marriage registrar after Egypt. By 2006, women accounted for over 22% of the Federal National Council. The UAE's minister of state post is Reem Al Hashimi, who is the first female minister to be in this position and have that role. The UAE appointed in 2004 its first female minister, Lubna Al Qasimi, who was a member of the Sharjah royal family and served as the minister of economics and planning although her background was in information technology.

In Sep. 2013, Lana Nusseibeh was appointed as the UAE's first female Permanent Representative to the United Nations, and she was elected in 2017 as President of the UN Women Executive Board.

Emirati women must receive permission from male guardian to remarry. This requirement is derived from Sharia, and has been considered a federal law since 2005. In all emirates, it is illegal for Muslim women to marry non-Muslims. In the UAE, a marriage union between a Muslim woman and non-Muslim man is punishable by law, since it is considered a form of "fornication".

== Sexual violence ==
=== Sexual assault ===
Human rights groups express concern over what they consider a criminalization of rape victims. In two cases, women who reported being raped were sentenced to prison for "engaging in extramarital relations", as their allegations were considered unfounded by authorities.

Over 50% of women residents in the UAE say that they would not report a rape to the police.

In 2010, a Muslim woman in Abu Dhabi recanted her allegations of being gang-raped by 6 men, claiming that the police threatened her with corporal punishment for premarital sex. In 2013, a Norwegian woman, Marte Dalelv, received a prison sentence of sixteen months in Dubai for perjury, consensual extramarital sex, and alcohol consumption, after she reported her boss to the police for an alleged rape; she was later fully pardoned and allowed to leave the country. Men involved in these alleged rapes were also convicted for extramarital sex. Another victim of rape was arrested in 2016, this time a British national. She alleges that she was raped by British men and the matter is still being investigated.

Nadya Khalife, a researcher for Human Rights Watch, says that "these charges will make young women in the UAE, citizens and tourists alike, think twice about seeking justice and reporting sexual assaults for fear of being charged themselves". She also stated that "the message to women is clear: victims will be punished for speaking out and seeking justice, but sexual assault itself will not be properly investigated".

In 2016, a Dutch rape victim, originally charged with sex outside marriage, was released by authorities.

=== False allegations crimes ===
Many western associations state that many women who reported rape but were convicted for false allegations are still victims of rape. This is what they call the criminalization of rape victims. The Emirates Center for Human Rights expressed concern over Dubai's criminalization of what they call "rape victims".

In Dubai, a woman who engages in consensual extramarital relations and presses false allegations of rape can be sentenced to over a year of time in prison.

The Emirates Center for Human Rights states that "Until laws are reformed, victims of sexual violence in the UAE will continue to suffer" referring to a case in July 2013 in which a 24-year-old Norwegian woman reported an alleged rape to the police and received a prison sentence for "perjury, consensual extramarital sex and alcohol consumption" after she admitted lying about the rape.

== Education ==
The 2007 report on the progress of MDGs in the UAE states, "the proportion of females in higher education has risen remarkably at a rate that has not been achieved in any other country in the world. During the years 1990 to 2004, the number of female university students has grown to double that of male students. This is the result of the promotion and encouragement of women's education by state and family." Upon completion of high school, 95% of Emirati women continue on to higher education and constitute 75% of the student population at the Al Ain national university. Women constitute 70% of college graduates in the UAE. According to Dubai Women's College, 50-60% of its 2,300 students proceed to seek employment upon graduation.

The literacy rate of women in the UAE is 95.8%, while it is 93.1% among men. Women constitute 80-90% of the student population at two of the nation's three federal institutions of higher learning. At the end of 2000, female literacy in the UAE stood at 79% while male literacy was at 75%. Both genders had an equal literacy rate in 1990, and it stood at 75%. In 1975, the rate of female literacy rate was 31% while male literacy stood at 54%. Also, 77% of Emirati women enroll in higher education in secondary school.

Women account for 56% of the UAE's graduates in STEM courses at government universities. At the Masdar Institute of Science, 60% of Emirati graduate students are female.

== Occasions ==
=== Emirati Women's Day ===
Emirati Women's Day, August 28, is a national United Arab Emirates day dedicated to gender equality and women empowerment. It was celebrated for the first time in 2015 upon the initiative of Fatima Bint Mubarak and it marks the anniversary of the creation of the UAE's General Women's Union.

=== Emirates Women Award ===
The Emirates Women Award was launched in 2003 to recognize women in the UAE (both expatriates and citizens) who have been successful in their businesses and careers. The award honors 12 women every cycle in the business and professional categories as well as the leadership, strategic and financial planning, career achievements, community contributions, innovation criteria.

== See also ==
- Women in Arab societies
- Women's rights in the United Arab Emirates
- Women in Islam
- Women in Asia
