= Alia Abdulnoor =

Emirati convict (1977–2019)

- علياء عبد النور
- Born: November 20, 1977
- Died: May 4, 2019 (aged 41); Tawam hospital, Al Ain, Abu Dhabi, UAE
- Known for: Alleged victim of human rights abuse and death of breast cancer during incarceration
- Criminal charge: Terrorism financing
- Criminal penalty: 10 years imprisonment

Alia Abdulnoor (Arabic: علياء عبد النور; 20 November 1977 – 4 May 2019) was an Emirati woman convicted of supporting and financing Al Qaeda. She was arrested in 2015 and sentenced in 2017 to a 10 year imprisonment on convictions of financing Al Qaeda, transmitting it's communications, and promoting its ideology; however, human rights activists and her family claim she was arrested for donations made to Syrian women and children in 2011 during the Syrian civil war. While imprisoned, Abdulnoor was allegedly tortured and denied medical assistance for her breast cancer relapse. Despite calls for release from human rights activists, she died in 2019 in Tawam hospital in Al Ain, Abu Dhabi.

== Arrest and sentencing ==
Abdulnoor was arrested alongside her sister in July 2015 at her family home in the Emirate of Ajman. (Note: The New Arab states Abdulnoor was arrested in November 2015, but the United Nations and the MENA Rights Group say she was arrested in July) She was arrested in a raid by police officers posing as civilians, and was held in solitary confinement in an enforced disappearance for the following four months, with limited information regarding her arrest. During the arrest, she was prevented from wearing her hijab and was physically assaulted, according to Al Jazeera Arabic.

She received a sentence for promoting Al Qaeda ideology, financially supporting the group, and assisting in terrorism in February 2017. According to the prosecution, Abdulnoor aided Al Qaeda online by acting as a messenger between members, supplying the group with money, and publishing false information about the UAE online. She confessed to the charges and provided additional information regarding the group and its members.

Her arrest drew controversy as many activists and her family believed it was tied to Abdulnoor's donations in 2011 during the Syrian civil war, giving financial support to Syrian mothers and children. According to The New Arab, the only evidence presented was a record of websites Abdulnoor had visited. The news agency also claimed she was not politically active other than the donations.

== Imprisonment ==
Abdulnoor initially lived in an eight-person prison cell in al-Wathba prison with around 20 to 40 other inmates, and she reportedly developed depression. After allegedly being told that her sister would be killed, Abdulnoor was coerced into signing a confession, and received a 10 year sentence. An inmate who was imprisoned with Abdulnoor and her sister, Asma, claimed Abdulnoor was denied medical care, forced to eat expired, contaminated, and infested foods, drugged with sedatives, and lived in unhygienic conditions. Others forms of violence Abdulnoor allegedly experienced were sexual and gender-based violence, sleep deprivation, and interrogational torture. After receiving her sentence in 2017, Abdulnoor was moved to live in an isolated windowless hospital room in Al Mafraq Hospital.

Abdulnoor relapsed during her imprisonment, and her breast cancer came back. The United Arab Emirates spokesman for public prosecution claimed Abdulnoor received treatment for cancer in 2008, which was funded by the country, and that she relapsed in 2017 following her conviction. The government also claimed she refused medical assistance and went on several hunger strikes while imprisoned. However, human rights activists, including Marco Perduca, rejected this version of events, claiming she was coerced into agreeing to not receive medical treatment. In February 2019, United Nations human rights experts called for Abdrulnoor's release from jail after reports of her poor prison conditions, including allegedly being chained to a bed while under watch of an armed guard. Activists also pressured the government for her release as Abdulnoor, who at this point had terminal breast cancer, was unexpected to survive. The United Nations special rapporteurs called for her to be able to "live her last days of life in dignity and with her family at home".

== Death ==
Abdulnoor was transferred to Tawam hospital in Al Ain, Abu Dhabi, on 10 January 2019, without the knowledge or consent of her family. The family were only notified following repeated efforts to contact her. She died on 4 May 2019 at the hospital as a result of the breast cancer. A spokesperson for the UAE, in a statement to the government news agency WAM, claimed she died while receiving treatment in Tawam hospital, and that her family members were allowed to visit.
