= Tayseer Najjar =

Jordanian journalist (1975–2021)

- Born: 1975
- Died: 19 February 2021 (aged 45–46); Amman, Jordan
- Occupation: Journalist
- Status: Released, 12 February 2019
- Penalty: 3 years in prison and AED 500,000 fine (approximately $136,000 fine pardoned in February 2019)

Tayseer Najjar (Arabic: تيسير النجار) (1975 – 19 February 2021) was a Jordanian journalist who was convicted in the United Arab Emirates (UAE) and given a three-year prison term for violating the country's defamation law. He was sentenced under Article 29 of the United Arab Emirates cyber crime law, by posting comments on the social network Facebook expressing support for armed groups in Gaza and criticising the UAE's support of Egypt's decision to destroy Hamas tunnels in the 2014 Israeli aggression on Gaza. Tayseer was due to be released on 13 December 2018, and was facing a fine of AED 500,000, equivalent to US$136,000. Tayseer's sentence was extended for six more months because he was unable to pay the fine. On 12 February 2019, Najjar was released from prison and returned to his home country, Jordan. His fine was pardoned.

== Background ==
According to Human Rights Watch, Najjar was convicted on the basis of his Facebook posts written before he moved to the UAE and criticism on phone calls with his wife. Reportedly, his critical conversations with his wife over the telephone were cited by the trial judgment without disclosing how the UAE authorities obtained records of the calls. Human Rights Watch stated that Najjar's rights to due process and a fair trial were violated by the UAE authorities by not allowing him to access a lawyer including during interrogations, for more than a year. Najjar wrote on Facebook:

"Message to some journalists and writers who do not like the Gazan resistance, there is no two rights in one case, but the right one is the Gazan resistance and all else is bad – such as Israel, the UAE, [Egyptian President Abdel Fattah] el-Sisi and other regimes that are no longer ashamed of shame itself."

Najjar was questioned about expressing his support for armed groups.

== Death ==
He died on 19 February 2021 in Amman, due to a pre-existing heart condition.
