= Secret Dubai =

Saudi blog

Secret Dubai was one of the most popular independent blogs in Dubai, United Arab Emirates in the 8 years of its operation, from 2002 until 2010. Launched in 2002 and written by an unidentified expatriate, Secret Dubai generated a significant following in the Middle East Blogosphere until the UAE's Telecoms Regulatory Authority (TRA) blocked the website in the UAE. In 2007, it won a Bloggie award for Africa and the Middle East. The blog was temporarily blocked by UAE authorities in 2005. The blog's last entry date is April 2014.
