= United Arab Emirates Anti-Discrimination Law =

The United Arab Emirates Anti-Discrimination Law was enacted in the United Arab Emirates on July 20, 2015, when it was signed by President Sheikh Khalifa. Under this law, any form of discrimination against people and religion is outlawed. Penalties include jail terms ranging from six months to over 10 years and/or fines ranging from DH 50,000 to DH 2 million.

== Provisions ==
The law governs oral and written communications such as books, pamphlets, online media such as blogs, social media posts, website articles and online comments. It outlaws acts of hate and labelling other religious groups or individuals as atheist or unbelievers. The law is intended to strengthen the UAE as a progressive and equal rights society.

The law criminalizes acts that are considered to be insulting to a deity of a particular religion, prophets, apostles, holy books, houses of worship, or graveyards. Provisions include an anti-discrimination advocate for disputes based on religion, caste, doctrine, race, color or ethnic origin.

It outlaws violence such as hate speech and promotion of discrimination on all media platforms. Any expression of hate against people and religion in spoken and published media is outlawed.

== Federal Decree-Law No. 34 of 2023 ==
In 2023, the UAE issued the Federal Decree-Law No. 34 of 2023 Concerning Combating Discrimination, Hatred and Extremism which establishes a legal framework for preventing and penalizing acts of discrimination, hate speech, and extremism. The law defines discrimination as any distinction, restriction, or preference based on characteristics such as religion, belief, race, colour, ethnic origin, or gender. It also defines hate speech as any expression or conduct that incites discord or discrimination among individuals or communities, and extremism as ideologically motivated actions that threaten public order or promote discrimination or hatred. This legal framework sets out specific penalties for discrimination, hate speech, and incitement of tribal conflict, with aggravating circumstances applying when offences are committed by public officials, religious figures, or within places of worship. The legislation also provides mechanisms for reporting offences, including provisions granting immunity or reduced penalties to individuals who report incidents or assist authorities in preventing or investigating crimes. It also outlines judicial jurisdiction between emirate-level and federal courts, particularly in cases involving extremism.

== See also ==
- Censorship in Islamic societies
- Government of the United Arab Emirates
