= Alicia Gali =

Australian woman

Alicia Gali is an Australian woman who was jailed for eight months in Fujairah, United Arab Emirates in 2008. She was accused of having illicit sexual relationship under UAE law after reporting to the police about being drugged and raped by three co-workers. Her case raised public attention and criticism of the UAE's justice system's handling of the incident.

== Alleged rape in Le Méridien hotel ==
Alicia Gali had been working as a beauty salon manager in the Le Méridien Al Aqah Beach Resort, Fujairah. She spent an evening drinking with three co-workers. She claimed that when she woke up the next day, she was "naked, with broken ribs and massive bruising" but admitted she had no memory of the night before. Her co-workers denied under oath that there was any assault, and testified in court that Gali consented to have sex with them. They allege that her injuries were caused by her falling whilst dancing on a table.

== Jail period ==
Following the alleged rape, Gali contacted an Australian consular officer in neighbouring Dubai. She was not warned that unproven rape complaints could lead to sex outside marriage charges under the local law. Gali had reported the alleged rape to the local police. However, the men testified in court that the sex was consensual and no evidence could be provided that rape occurred. Gali and the accused men were arrested and all were sentenced to imprisonment for a period of 12 months for having an extra-matrimonial sexual relationship. She was released from prison after eight months in March 2009. The court ruled that the victim engaged in “consensual sex”because she had agreed to enter the car of one of the men – an act of willingness that denoted she knew what she was getting into.

== Lawsuits ==
Gali has sued her employers at the hotel for breaching its workplace obligations by failing to have a system in place to protect their workers against assault. The hotel management claimed to have offered Gali the required support after the case.

Gali also later sued the Australian government, arguing that they failed to give her proper advice.

== Publicity ==
The Australian government requested Gali's family not to publicize the case during her imprisonment period. Gali's release, her criticism of the Australian consular service and her lawsuit against Starwood gained international media attention. The story was published in HuffPost, A 30-minute documentary film about the case was published in Yahoo News Australia on the Sunday Night program.
