= Signals Intelligence Agency =

U.A.E. signals intelligence organization

The State Security Department (SSD), is the United Arab Emirates intelligence agency. It was deemed as the equivalent of the CIA

== History ==
In response to alleged cyber spying on opponents of Iran's best interests by the government of Iran during 2010 and 2011, the United States assisted the United Arab Emirates in late 2011 with establishing NESA. Created in 2012 through a Federal Decree Law, one of its official objectives is to organize the protection of the UAE's communications network and information systems.

== Activities ==
The agency participated in Project Raven, a confidential initiative to help the UAE surveil other governments, militants, and human rights activists. In 2014, Project Raven helped the SIA (NESA at the time) break up an ISIS network in the UAE.

In December 2019, The New York Times reported that the SIA or other Emirati intelligence services used ToTok, a messaging app widely used by the Emirati public, to record all conversations, movements, relationships, appointments, sounds and images by the app's users.

=== Schools ===
In May 2014, NESA launched Cyber Quest, a competition for school and university students. As of 2019, CyberQuest is on its 5th edition. And it has several social media accounts that cover the competition including a Twitter account and Instagram Account.

== See also ==
- DarkMatter (company)
- NSO Group
- Stealth Falcon
- George Nader
- Elliott Broidy
