= Mercato Shopping Mall =

Shopping centre in Jumeirah, Dubai

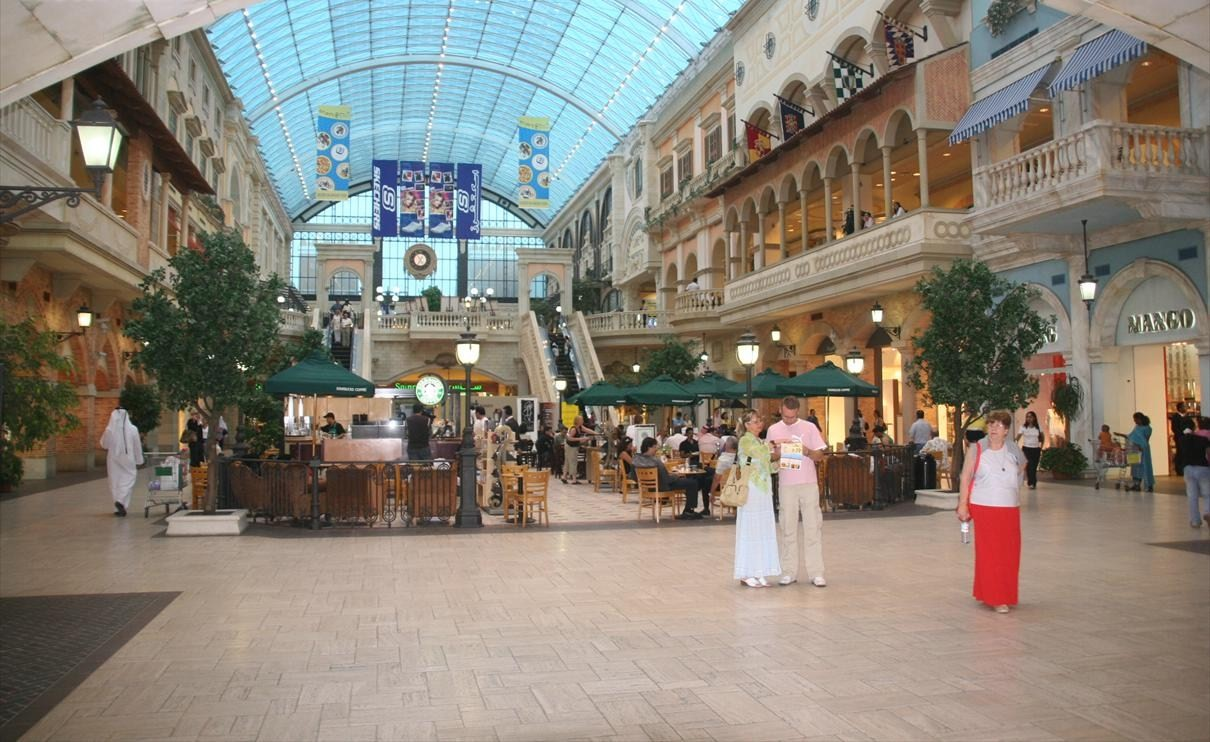
- Location: Dubai, United Arab Emirates
- Coordinates: 25°12′58″N 55°15′10″E
- Opened: 28 October 2002; 24 years ago
- Developer: Al Zarooni Group
- Owner: Al Zarooni Group
- Num. of stores: 90+
- Floor area: 22,900 m^{2} (247,000 sq ft)
- Parking: 1000
- Website: mercatoshoppingmall.com

Mercato Shopping Mall is a shopping centre in the Jumeirah area of Dubai, United Arab Emirates. The mall is designed to look like a Mediterranean town during the European Renaissance in Italy. Opening in 2002, the name "mercato" comes from the Italian word meaning "market." The mall has a gross leasable area of 22,900 m^{2} (247,000 sq ft) and a total area of 59,900 m^{2} (645,000 sq ft).

== Stores ==
Stores include:

- Axiom Telecom
- PAUL
- Spinneys
- Beauty By Edge

== Gallery ==
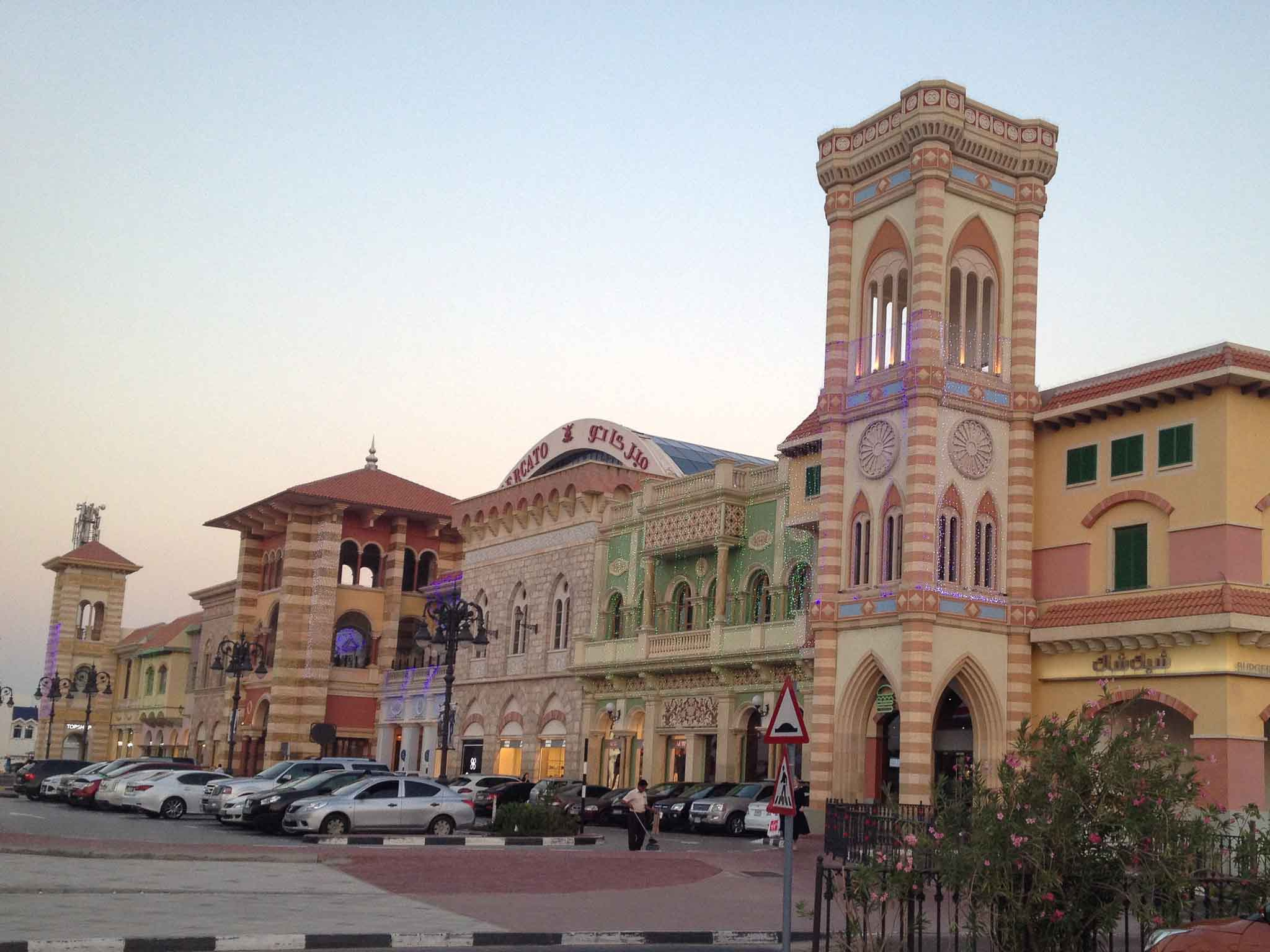
Exterior of Mercato shopping mall

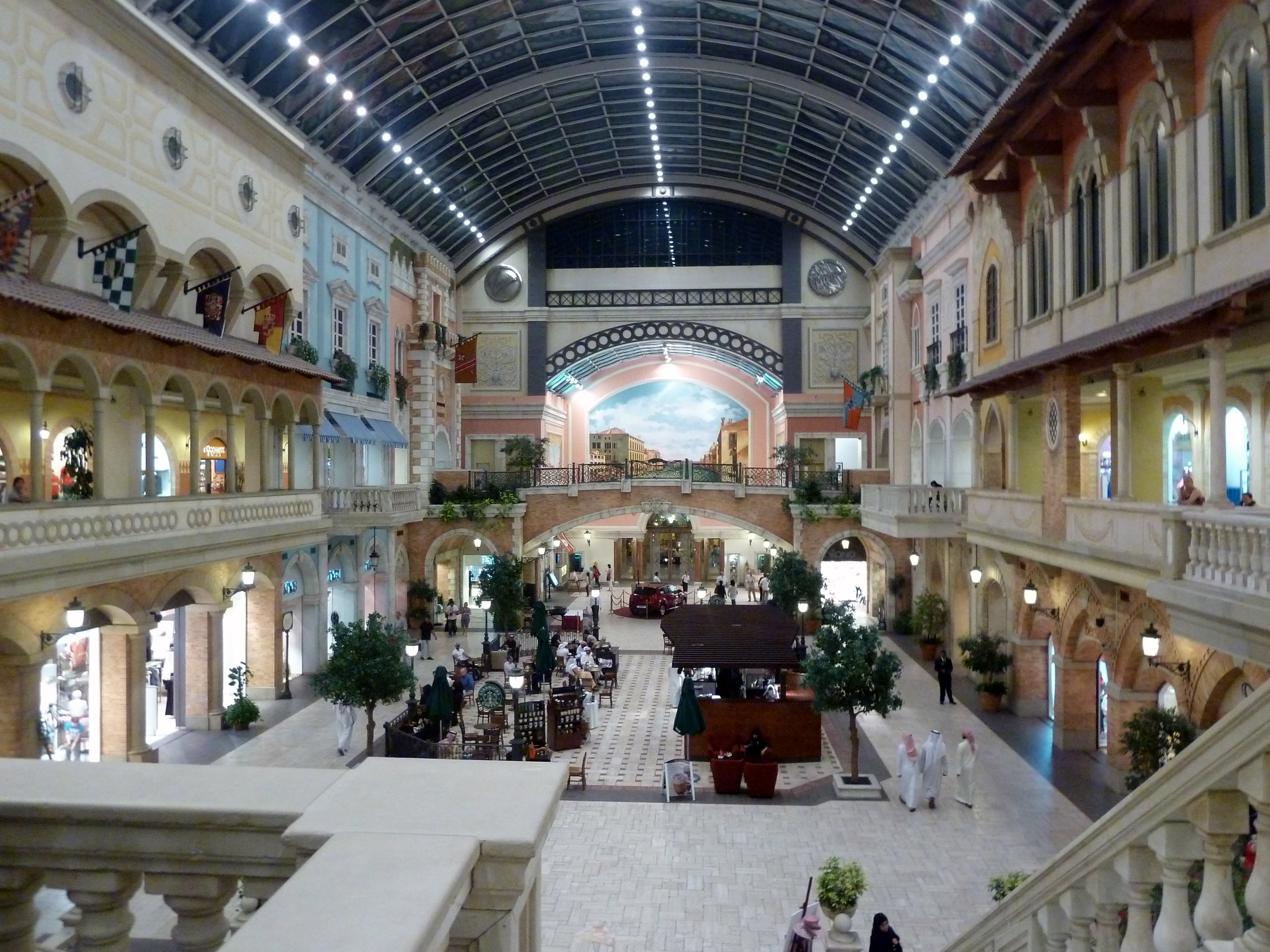
Interior of Mercato shopping mall

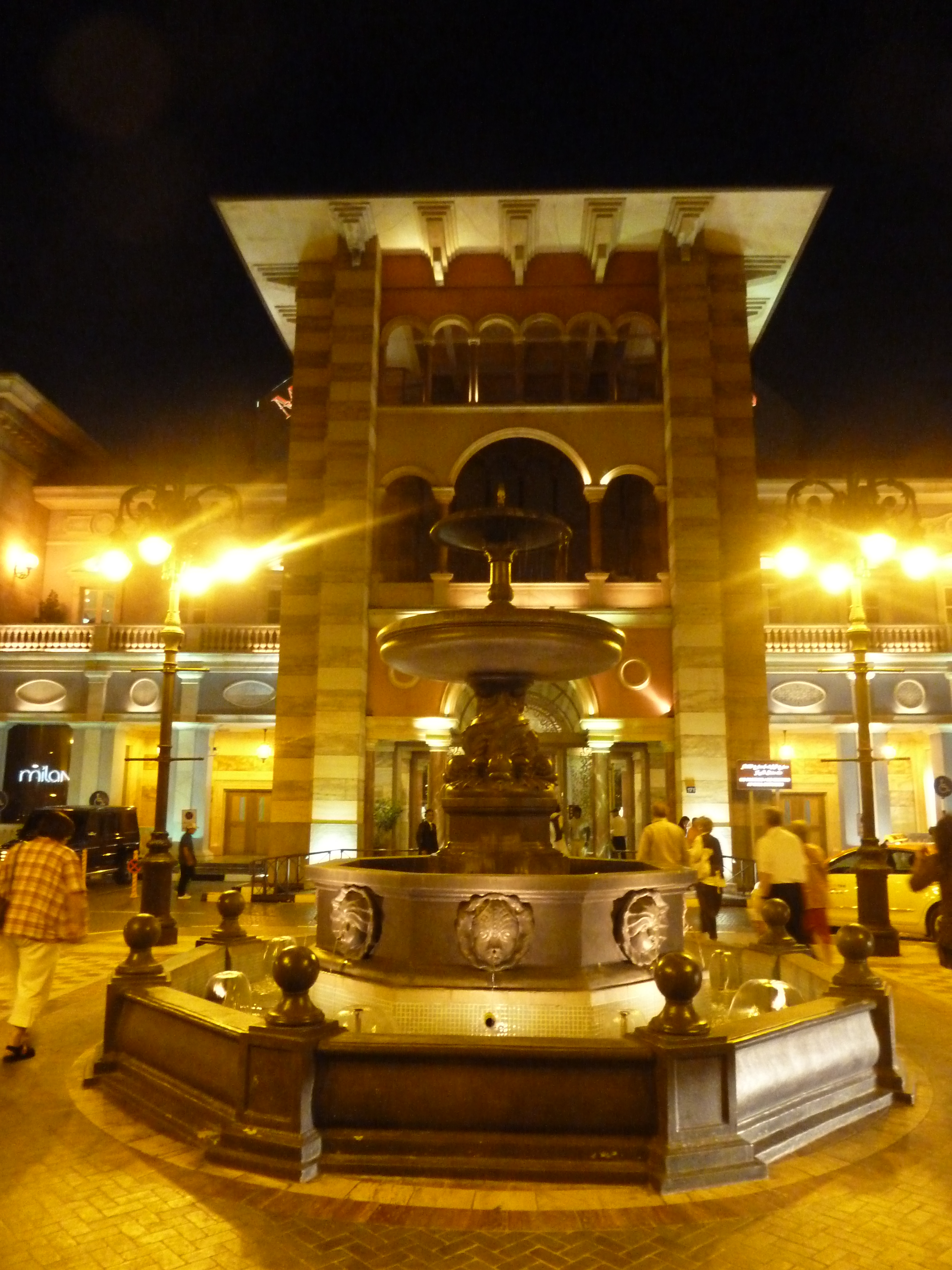
Entrance fountain

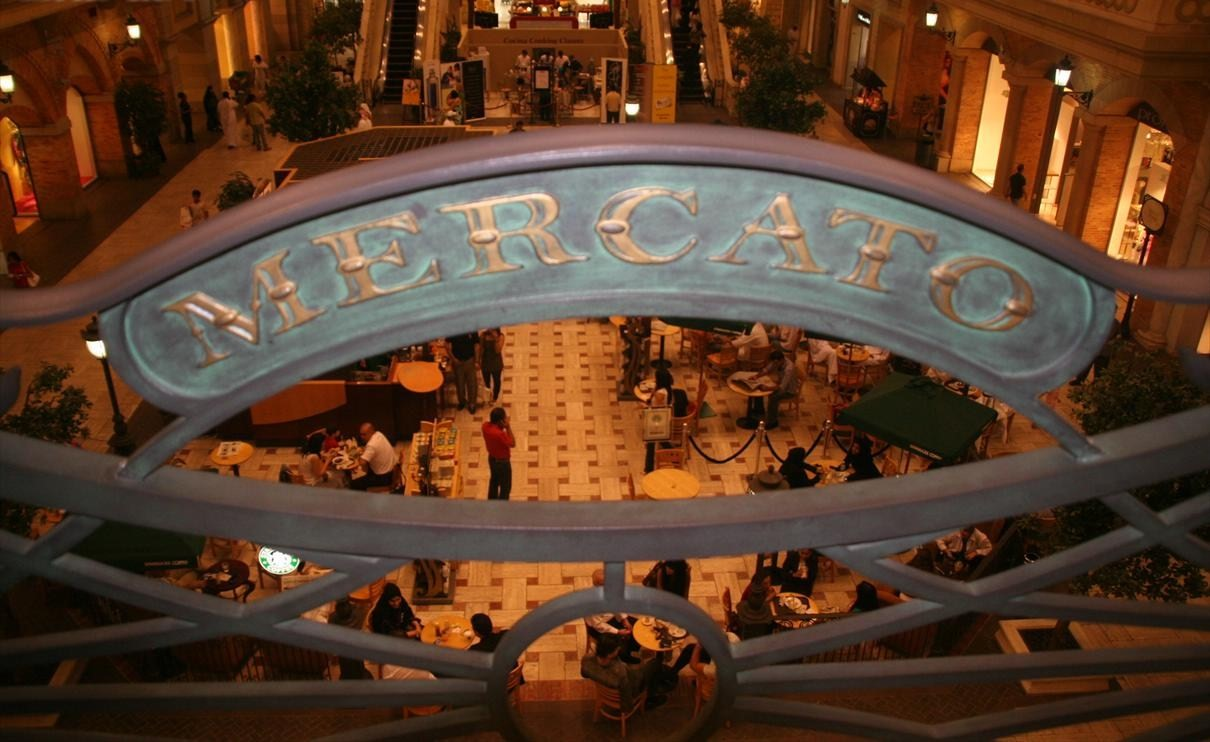
Mercato Shopping Mall
