= ToTok =

Emirati messaging app

- ToTok logo
- Developer: Breej Holding as a front of DarkMatter Group
- Release: 2019
- Operating system: iOS, Android
- Type: Communication
- Website: totok.ai

ToTok was a messaging app and Voice over IP app, developed by Breej Holding, a UAE-based company. It was the first Voice over IP app which the Emirati government allowed, and introduced in 2019 in the Abu Dhabi Global Market economic free zone. According to The New York Times, it was also a mass surveillance tool of the United Arab Emirates intelligence services, used to gather private information on users' phones. The Times's reporting, denied by the app's developers, caused Google and Apple to remove the app in December 2019.

== Development and features ==
The app was developed by Breej Holding Ltd, a UAE-based company. According to the New York Times, Breej Holding is a front company of DarkMatter, an Emirati intelligence company under FBI investigation for cybercrimes. The app purportedly was developed by Giacomo Ziani. Sheikh Tahnoun bin Zayed Al Nahyan's adopted son was reportedly the sole director of Breej Holding Ltd. ToTok was linked to Pax AI, an Emirati data mining firm tied to DarkMatter and located in the same building as the Emirates' Signals Intelligence Agency.

ToTok app offered free messaging, voice calls and video calls. Conference calls involving up to 20 people could also be made. According to The New York Times, the app appeared to be a slightly-customized copy of YeeCall, a Chinese messaging app.

== Popularity ==
Introduced in 2019, it soon found a wide user base in the Emirates. Its spread was aided by the fact that the Emirati government blocks certain functions of other messaging services such as Skype and WhatsApp, and was apparently the first Voice over IP app to gain regulatory approval. The app was also promoted by state-linked Emirati publications and by the Chinese telecommunications company Huawei. That ToTok appeared to not be affiliated with a powerful country may also have helped its popularity in the Middle East. In December 2019, BotIM, a subscription-based messaging app, sent its users a message recommending ToTok for free messaging and calls.

As of December 2019, ToTok was among the most-used 50 free apps in several countries including Saudi Arabia, the United Kingdom, India and Sweden. As of December 2019, the app had 7.9 million downloads between the iOS App Store and Google Play, with nearly two million daily users.

== Surveillance tool reports ==
On 22 December 2019, The New York Times reported that U.S. intelligence assessments and the paper's own investigations showed that ToTok was used by Emirati intelligence to gather all conversations, movements, relationships, appointments, sounds and images by the app's users. The app does not use exploits, backdoors or malware. Instead, it gives the government access to the information shared through the app, as well as to other information on the smartphone that the government can access through permissions granted by users in order to enable the app's features.

Breej Holding denied that its app was a spy tool, writing that its users "have the complete control over what data they want to share at their own discretion. The shameless fabrication by our distractors [sic] cannot be further from the truth." The Emirati telecommunications agency issued a statement that emphasized what it said were the country's strict privacy laws, but did not directly address the Times's reporting. The local Khaleej Times interviewed the "ToTok co-founder" Giacomo Ziani, who confirmed that he bought YeeCall's code, but also denied that his app was a government surveillance tool.

In response to the Times's inquiries, Google and Apple removed ToTok from their respective app stores on 19 and 20 December 2019. The app re-appeared on Google Play on 3 January 2020, and disappeared again on 15 February 2020.

== See also ==
- Cyber spying
- We chat
