= Stealth Falcon =

Cybercrime group affiliated with Emirati government

Stealth Falcon is a cybercrime group affiliated to the United Arab Emirates (UAE) which is associated with Project Raven.

The nickname "Stealth Falcon" was given to the group by Citizen Lab.

The group has been known to deploy spear-phishing attacks against journalists and human rights activists. The group uses a variety of attack vectors, including PowerShell macros, URL shorteners, and social engineering.

== See also ==
- DarkMatter (Emirati company)
