= Faisal Al Bannai =

Emirati businessman

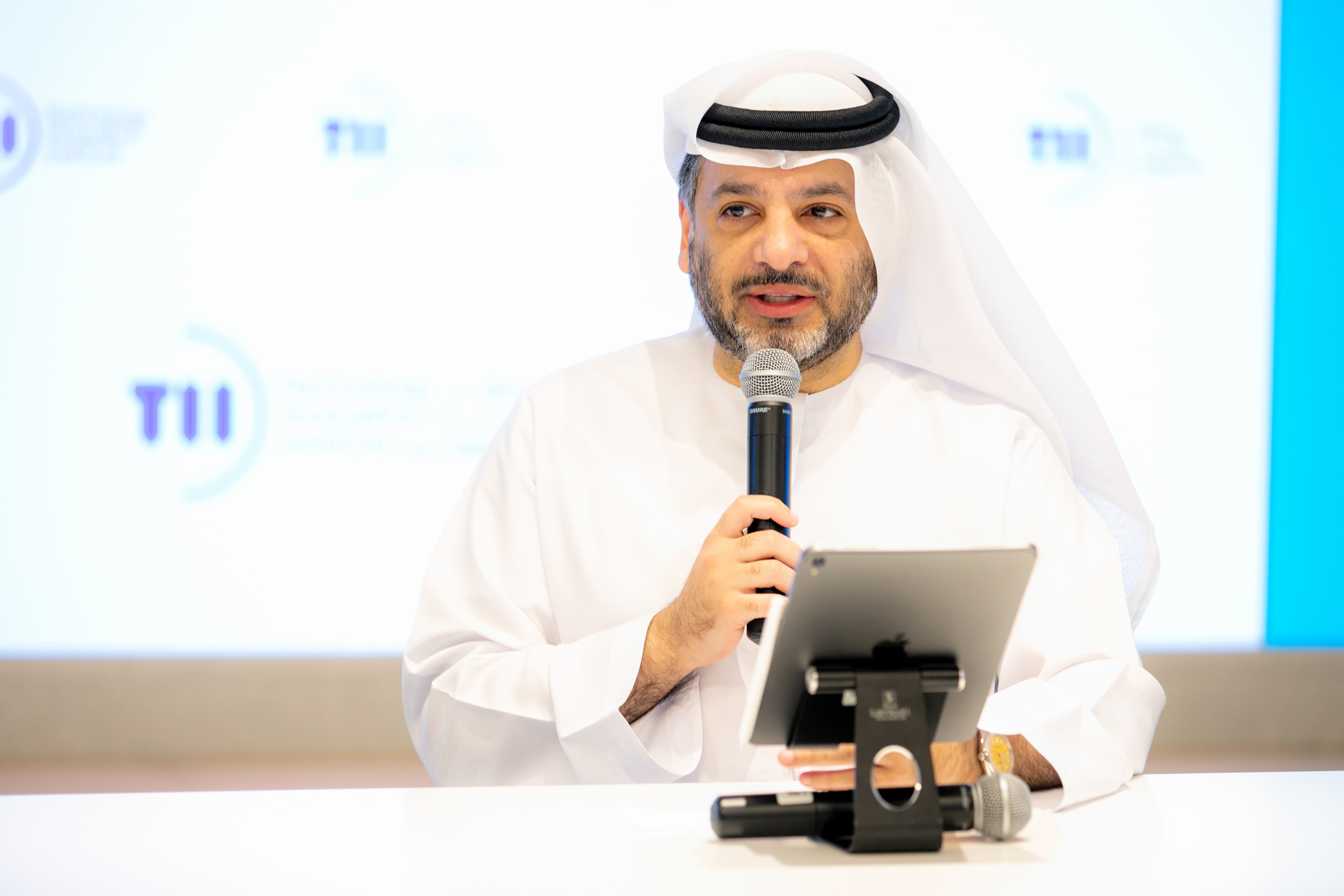
- Born: United Arab Emirates
- Known for: Axiom Telecom; EDGE Group; Advanced Technology Research Council; Technology Innovation Institute; Advisor to the UAE President for Strategic Research and Advanced Technology Affairs, with the rank of Minister.
- Title: Chairman of the Board of Directors; Secretary General; Board Member; Entrepreneur

Faisal Al Bannai (Arabic: فيصل البنّاي; full name Faisal Abdulaziz Mohammed Al Bannai) is an Emirati technology executive, entrepreneur, and government official. He serves as Advisor to the President of the United Arab Emirates for Strategic Research and Advanced Technology Affairs, with the rank of Minister. He is also Chairman of EDGE Group, one of the Middle East's largest advanced technology and defense groups, and Secretary General of the Advanced Technology Research Council (ATRC), Abu Dhabi's government entity responsible for advancing research, technology policy, and innovation. Through these roles, Al Bannai has contributed to the UAE's strategy in artificial intelligence, advanced research, defense technologies, and national technology development. He has a bachelor's degree in finance from Boston University and a master's degree in shipping trade and finance from City University of London.

== Career ==
=== Axiom Telecom ===
Al Bannai founded Axiom Telecom in 1997. Under his leadership, the company became one of the Middle East's largest mobile device distributors, operating across multiple regional markets and reportedly generating annual revenues of approximately US$2.5 billion. He served as the company's Managing Director before transitioning to public service.

=== EDGE Group ===
In 2019, Al Bannai led the establishment of EDGE Group, a UAE-based technology and defense conglomerate formed through the consolidation of more than 25 companies operating across autonomous systems, aerospace, electronic warfare, cyber technologies, precision systems, missiles and weapons, secure communications, and mission support.

He served as the group's founding CEO and MD before becoming Executive Chairman in January 2022. Under his leadership, EDGE expanded its international presence through strategic partnerships, research and development initiatives, and export activities, positioning itself among the fastest-growing defense technology groups globally.

=== Advanced Technology Research Council ===
Al Bannai has served as Secretary General of the ATRC since its establishment in 2020. The ATRC oversees Abu Dhabi's research and advanced technology ecosystem by shaping research priorities, developing technology policy, attracting strategic investment, and supporting the commercialization of emerging technologies. The council operates through its entities, including the Technology Innovation Institute (TII), ASPIRE, and VentureOne. Under Al Bannai's leadership, the ecosystem has expanded research across artificial intelligence, quantum technologies, advanced materials, robotics, secure communications, cryptography, biotechnology, and autonomous systems.

=== TII ===
The Technology Innovation Institute (TII), established as the ATRC's applied research arm, employs researchers across multiple scientific disciplines.During Al Bannai's tenure, TII developed the Falcon family of open-source large language models, including Falcon 3 (2024) and Falcon Arabic/Falcon-H1 Arabic (2026). Falcon gained international recognition for its performance among open-source AI models and contributed to the UAE's emergence as a leading developer of sovereign artificial intelligence technologies. In 2025, TII announced a partnership with NVIDIA to establish an AI and robotics research laboratory in Abu Dhabi.

=== AI71 ===
In November 2023, Al Bannai launched AI71 alongside Sheikh Khaled bin Mohamed bin Zayed Al Nahyan, Crown Prince of Abu Dhabi; an enterprise artificial intelligence company built on TII's Falcon models, AI71 develops AI-powered products and enterprise solutions across sectors including healthcare, education, legal services, government, and financial services, while also providing organizations with greater control over their data through self-hosted and sovereign AI deployments. The company is commercialized through VentureOne, ATRC's commercialization arm.

=== Advisor to the UAE President ===
On 5 April 2024, President Sheikh Mohamed bin Zayed Al Nahyan appointed Al Bannai as Adviser to the President for Strategic Research and Advanced Technology Affairs, with the rank of Minister. In this capacity, he advises the President on national research priorities, emerging technologies, advanced industrial capabilities, artificial intelligence, innovation policy, and strategic initiatives that strengthen the UAE's long-term technological competitiveness.

== Board positions ==
Artificial Intelligence and Advanced Technology Council (AIATC) — Member.

Emirates Research and Development Council — Board member.

Smart and Autonomous Systems Council — Member.

Khalifa University of Science and Technology — Member of the Board of Trustees.

United Arab Emirates University— Member of the University Council.

== Awards and Recognitions ==
Al Bannai has received several national and international recognitions for his contributions to technology, entrepreneurship, and innovation, including:

Pride of the Emiratesʼ medal, presented by H.H. Sheikh Hamdan bin Mohammed Al Maktoum, Crown Prince of Dubai, Deputy Prime Minister and Minister of Defense, 2024

Time100 AI, Named among TIME's 100 Most Influential People in Artificial Intelligence2024

Lifetime Achievement Award, presented by H.H. Sheikh Mohammed bin Rashid Al Maktoum, Vice President and Prime Minister of the UAE and Ruler of Dubai, 2005

Other recognitions include: Gulf Business Arab Power List 20#;2021,2019,2018 on Forbesʼs Top CEOs in the Middle East 2021 list; Arabian Businessʼs 100 Inspiring Leaders in the Middle East ranking, 2018; Technology Business Leader of the Year at the Gulf Business Awards, 2017; Dubai Quality Award, 2012; Arab Achievement Award, 2011;Arabian Business Awards, 2005.
