= Axiom Telecom =

- Industry: Telecommunications retail and Online Store
- Founded: 1997
- Founder: Faisal Al Bannai
- Area served: United Arab Emirates, Saudi Arabia
- Products: Smartphones, Tablets, Accessories
- Subsidiaries: Switch, My Candy Tech
- Website: www.axiomtelecom.com

Axiom Telecom is a technology retailer founded in 1997 by Faisal Al Bannai, with four employees at the start of its operations. Axiom became the official distributor for mobile consumer brands in the UAE and Saudi Arabia, including Samsung, Apple, LG, HTC, Huawei, Nokia, and BlackBerry.

== History ==
Axiom office, in Silicon Oasis, Dubai

In 2001, Axiom introduced its first retail outlet in the UAE.

In 2003, Axiom started its regional roll-out, and has since established a presence in Kuwait, Bahrain, Qatar, Oman, Saudi Arabia (2004), Egypt (2007), London in 2007, and India (2007).

In December 2005, TECOM Group, a member of Dubai Holding, acquired a 40 percent share of Axiom Telecom.

Axiom owns and operates stores through partner arrangements in the UAE with Spinneys and Union Co-op outlets. Axiom is also the exclusive telecom partner for Adnoc, Emarat, Enoc & Eppco petrol stations where mobile phone accessories are sold in over 350 locations.

In June 2011, Dubai Holding sold 14% of Axiom Telecom.

In 2013, 2014, and 2016, Axiom Telecom applied for an MVNO license to operate in Saudi Arabia.

In 2017, Axiom Telecom moved to Dubai Silicon Oasis from Jumeirah Lakes Towers.

== Operations ==
Axiom Telecom is a telecommunications retailer in the Middle East. Its operations include wholesale distribution, retail sales, digital services, and mobile device maintenance.

Axiom distributes mobile devices from brands including Nokia, Honor, Sony Ericsson, Motorola, Samsung, and Huawei. Axiom Telecom was appointed in 2010 as the distributor for Blackberry products across the Middle East.

Axiom Telecom operates in India under a joint venture with Future Group as Future Axiom Ltd. where it operates about 350 retail outlets.

Axiom Service Provider is an airtime service provider for the Thuraya Satellite Company. It has service agreements with international telecommunications operations. Axiom Service Provider is the national service provider for Thuraya in Iraq.
