= A. F. Salahuddin Ahmed =

Bangladeshi historian and thinker

- Born: 24 September 1924; Motihari, Bihar, British India
- Died: 19 October 2014 (aged 90); Dhaka, Bangladesh
- Education: University of Calcutta; University of Pennsylvania; University of London

A. F. Salahuddin Ahmed (Bengali: এ. এফ. সালাহ্উদ্দীন আহমদ; 24 September 1924 – 19 October 2014) was a Bangladeshi historian, humanist and rationalist thinker.

== Early life and education ==
Ahmed was born in Motihari, Bihar. He came from a Bengali Muslim family. His father Abu Ahmed Faizul Mohi, paternal grandfather Moulvi Ahmed, one of the early Bengali Muslim who was a high-ranking administrator in British India, and his maternal grandfather Azizul Haque, (who is credited with having a major contribution to the development of Henry Classification System of fingerprint method) were all students of the renowned Presidency College, Calcutta.

He received his I.A. from Surendranath College, (formerly Ripon College), and B.A. (Hons.) in history from Presidency College (now Presidency University). He completed his first M.A. in history from Calcutta University, and then a second M.A. in history from University of Pennsylvania, and his PhD in history from the School of Oriental and African Studies at University of London (1961).

== Professional career ==
Ahmed started his teaching career in 1948 as a lecturer at Jagannath College, Dhaka. Later, he was a lecturer, reader, and then professor of history at Rajshahi University. He was also a professor of history at Jahangir Nagar University and Dhaka University, the job from which he retired in 1984. In 1963, Ahmed was invited by the American Historical Association as a visiting lecturer in South Asian history at the University of Pennsylvania and the University of Chicago. He was also UNESCO Cultural Fellow at Kyoto University, Japan in 1956. Ahmed was also associated with Independent University, Bangladesh as Professor of National Culture and Heritage, and served as the president of the National Association of Social Sciences of Bangladesh, and chairman of the United Nations Association of Bangladesh.

== Personal life ==
Ahmed married Hamida Khanom, who was one of the very few early Muslim graduates (I.A. and B.A.) from Bethune College, Calcutta. She completed her M.A. from Calcutta University, and then a second B.A. (Hons.) from University College London. She retired as Principal of Home Economics College, Dhaka. Hamida provided support and inspiration to Ahmed in his professional career throughout their long 60 years of married life.

== Publications ==
The following quote from the review of one of Ahmed's book: Perspectives on History, Society and Politics published by Readers Service, Kolkata, 2001, aptly captures his views and reputation

"This is a compilation of articles written over last two decades by a renowned historian of Bangladesh, Professor A.F. Salahuddin Ahmed on topics relating to history, society, and politics of the Indo-Pakistan-Bangladesh subcontinent, which is now known as South Asia. The main contention of the author is this that despite political divisions which took place in 1947 the people of this vast region belong to "one indivisible civilization which is the product of over thousand years of historical development." It was due to the machinations of "certain vested interests, both indigenous and foreign" the common people had to pass through untold misery and suffering: and, these 'vested interests, even threatened their 'civilized existence. Professor Ahmed is of the opinion that the destinies of the common people inhabiting this sub-continent 'are closely interlinked'. "They must", therefore, "learn to live together in peace which is essential for their development and progress." He made sincere efforts through these articles to promote greater awareness about the problems raised and to provoke "new thoughts concerning peace and understanding among the people of the three countries."

In 2012, Ahmed contributed a chapter, entitled "Bangladesh, Present, and Future Prospects" in a memorial book in honor of his younger deceased brother, Fakhruddin Ahmed, a career diplomat, and twice foreign secretary of Bangladesh, titled, Regional Cooperation and Globalization: Bangladesh, South Asia and Beyond edited by Dr. Zillur Rahman Khan and Dr. Meghna Guha Thakurta, where he makes a case for appreciating historical perspectives of social and political events:

The present state of Bangladesh has to be viewed in the light of the past because, as has been said, the present "is the child of the past and parent of the future." In order to understand the problems and predicaments which confront the country at the present moment we have to turn back to the past. Without understanding the past we cannot understand the present. If we look at history we would find that during the past hundred years or so phenomenal changes have taken place in what may be called the psyche of the Muslims who form the great majority of population of the region. These changes have to be explained and analysed in historical perspective.

In 2004, Ahmed in collaboration with Bazlul Momin Choudhury, published a comprehensive editorial volume on the history of Bangladesh, entitled Bangladesh: National Culture and Heritage: An Introductory Reader, which gives an overview of the land, society, culture and religions, and history of the peoples of Bangladesh.

Some other notable books in English and Bengali written by Ahmed are:

- Social ideas and social change in Bengal 1818-18-35
- Bangladesh Tradition and Transformation, Bengali Nationalism and the Emergence of Bangladesh
- Itihash O oitijjo Bangalir Sadhana O Bhangalir Muktijuddha
- Bangladesh Jatiyabad, Swadhinata, Gonotantro

He has also contributed many articles in professional journals.

== Social activities ==
Ahmed's interest and involvement in social service is reflected by his work for the Red Cross during the turbulent period of Partition of India, and his association with the Radical Democratic Party founded by M.N.Roy, and his active involvement in Ahmed Memorial Foundation established by family members dedicated to the educational and social welfare of their ancestral village of Bashbaria in Faridpur, Bangladesh (Now Muksudpur Upazila, Gopalganj District). He maintained an active life until the day he died, serving as the National Professor, writing and publishing articles, giving media interviews. He maintained worldwide contacts with his students, and professional acquaintances, as well as with their children and grandchildren, as many of them continued to seek him out for advice and support, as did his own family, and his house served as intellectual, social, and family gathering place during his lifetime.

== Awards ==
- Ekushey Padak (1991)
- Bangladesh Sadhinota Padak (Independence Day Award), (1999)
- National Professor appointed by the government of Bangladesh, 2011
