= Absence of fingerprints-congenital milia syndrome =

- Other names: Absence of dermatoglyphics congenital milia, Baird syndrome, Adermatoglyphia with congenital facial milia and acral blisters, digital contractures, and nail abnormalities, Basan syndrome.
- Specialty: Medical genetics
- Symptoms: adermatoglyphia with neo-natal blisters and facial milia
- Complications: Usually none (health-wise), however; hypohidrosis may lead to heat exhaustion or even a heat stroke, and the absence of fingerprints may complicate the use of systems that require fingerprint-identification
- Usual onset: Birth
- Duration: Life-long
- Types: Adermatoglyphia syndromes
- Causes: Genetic mutation
- Risk factors: Having a parent with the disorder
- Diagnostic method: Physical examination, genetic testing
- Differential diagnosis: Isolated adermatoglyphia
- Prevention: none
- Prognosis: Good
- Frequency: extremely rare, only 10 families worldwide are known to be affected with this disorder.

Absence of fingerprints-congenital milia syndrome, also known simply as Baird syndrome is an extremely rare autosomal dominant genetic disorder which is characterized by a lack of fingerprints and the appearance of blisters and facial milia soon after birth. It has been described in ten families worldwide.

== Presentation ==
People with this disorder often have congenital adermatoglyphia, facial milia and blisters soon after birth, hypohidrosis (less sweating than average), and either thin or thickened skin throughout the body.

Single transversal palmar lines, plantar keratoderma, nail grooving, toe syndactyly and finger camptodactyly have also been reported. Rarely, constriction ring syndrome is reported.

== Causes ==
Through a large Han Chinese family with the disorder, it was found to be caused by mutations in the SMARCAD1 gene, in chromosome 4. This gene produces a protein that is believed to control genes associated with the development of the fingerprints.
