= PCER =

PCER can refer to:

- Per-comparison error rate, a concept used in statistics
- Partija za Celosna Emancipacija na Romite, a Macedonian political party
- A US Navy hull classification symbol: Patrol craft escort rescue (PCER)
