= Hem Chandra Bose =

Bengali police officer

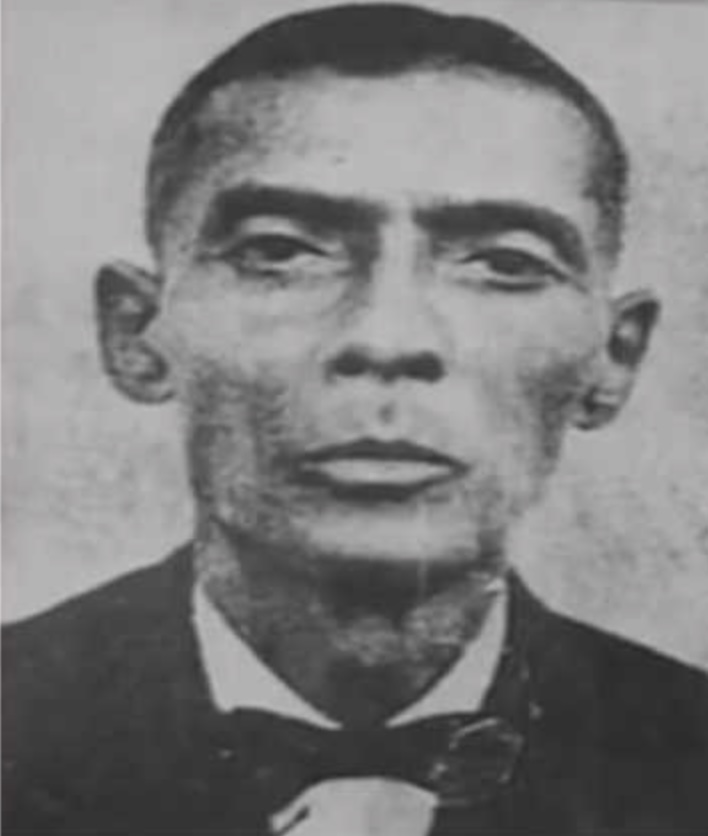
- Born: 1867; Damurhuda Upazila, Bengal Presidency, British India (present-day Chuadanga District, Bangladesh)
- Died: April 3/1, 1949 (aged 81/82); Calcutta, India
- Occupations: Police officer, mathematician
- Years active: 1889–1925
- Employer: Bengal Police Service
- Organization: Calcutta Anthropometric Bureau (later the Fingerprint Bureau)
- Known for: Development of the Henry Classification System for cataloging fingerprints
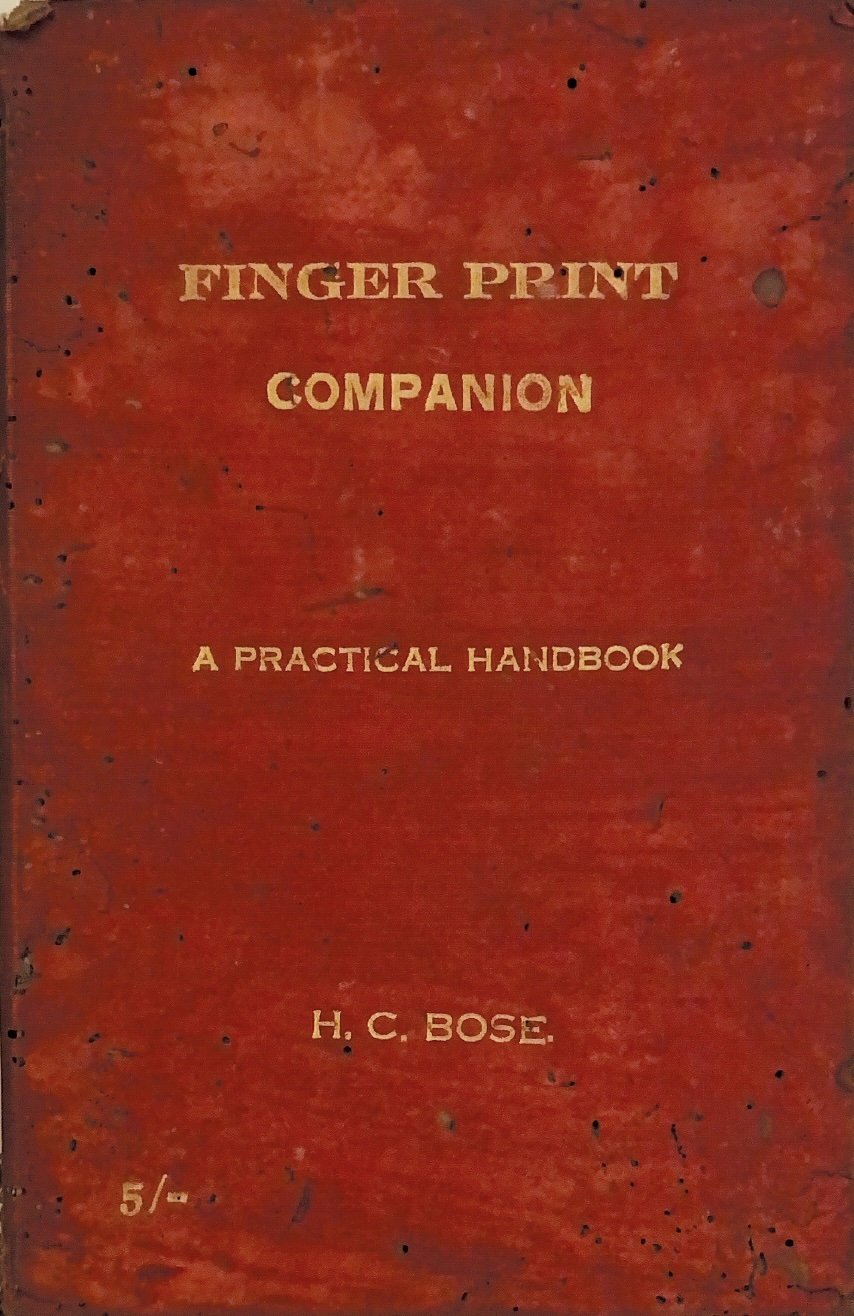
- Notable work: Finger Print Companion, A Practical Handbook, by H. C. Bose. Author and Publisher, Finger Print Bureau, Writers' Buildings, Calcutta, 1927 Finger Print Companion
- Title: Rai Bahadur
- Spouse: Saibalini Ghosh
- Children: 6 daughters and 1 son, all deceased: Usharani Ghosh; Puspa Guha Thakurta; Abha Bose; Sudhamoy Bose
- Relatives: Many of his grandchildren established themselves in different fields and became most successful in their lives in Kolkata: Gita Dutta, school teacher; Mita Ghosh; Dr. Sudhindra Kumar Dutta; Rathindra Kumar Dutta; Dr. Rathindra Nath Ghosh, noted gynaecologist, owner of Eveland Nursing Home, Southern Avenue, Kolkata; Sunanda Bakshi; Goutam Ghosh, noted civil engineer and architect; Bhaskar Kumar Ghosh, noted Indian-American statistician especially known for his contributions to sequential analysis; Ratna Som, professor of Chemistry, Jogamaya Devi College; Subrata Guha Thakurta; Subir Guha Thakurta; His great-grandchildren work and reside in and around Kolkata and in different parts of the world, and they all proudly treasure this great family legacy. For questions on this page, please contact Susmita Gupta (nee Som) (great-granddaughter of Hem Chandra Bose)

Rai Bahadur Hem Chandra Bose (1867-1949) was an Indian police officer and mathematician at the Calcutta Anthropometric Bureau (later the Fingerprint Bureau). Supervised by Edward Henry, he and Azizul Haque developed the Henry Classification System for cataloging fingerprints.

== Life and career ==
Bose was born in 1867 in Damurhuda Upazila of the then Nadia District of Bengal Presidency, currently Chuadanga District of Bangladesh, in a Hindu Bengali Kayastha family. His father was a postman. After topping the matriculation examination in the year 1883 from Jessore Zilla School, he studied Mathematics at the Sanskrit College of Calcutta on a Scholarship from the Natore Raj, and completed his Bachelor of Science in 1888. He joined the Bengal Police Service as a sub inspector in 1889. Between 1889 and 1894 he was posted as an investigating officer in police stations in districts including Madhubani, Saharsa, Pabna and Narail. His keen detective work was noticed, and in 1894 he was posted at the Directorate Headquarters of the Criminal Investigation Department, or CID, of Bengal Police in Calcutta. There he worked on the fingerprinting system, and remained posted at the CID headquarters, except for a short stint as Instructor at the Sardah Police Training School in 1914–1917, until his retirement as a DySP in 1925. After his retirement, he lived in a small apartment in Maniktala in Calcutta with his family till his death from natural causes in 3/1 April 1949.

== Haque and Bose (1897) ==
On 12 June 1897, the Council of the Governor General of India approved a committee report that fingerprints should be used for classification of criminal records. After that year, the Kolkata Anthropometric Bureau became the world's first Fingerprint Bureau. He was working in the Calcutta Anthropometric Bureau (before it became the Fingerprint Bureau) with Azizul Haque. He and Haque were the two Indian fingerprint experts credited with primary development of the Henry Classification System (named for their supervisor, Edward Richard Henry). The Henry Classification System is still used in all English-speaking countries (primarily as the manual filing system for accessing paper archive files that have not been scanned and computerized).

== Bibliography ==
- Finger Print Companion (1927)

== See also ==
- Azizul Haque
- Edward Henry
- Henry Classification System
