= Henry Classification System =

Human fingerprint sorting system for searching

The Henry Classification System is a long-standing method by which fingerprints are sorted by physiological characteristics for one-to-many searching. Developed by Hem Chandra Bose, Qazi Azizul Haque and Sir Edward Henry in the late 19th century for criminal investigations in British India, it was the basis of modern-day AFIS (Automated Fingerprint Identification System) classification methods up until the 1990s. In recent years, the Henry Classification System has generally been replaced by ridge flow classification approaches.

== History and development ==
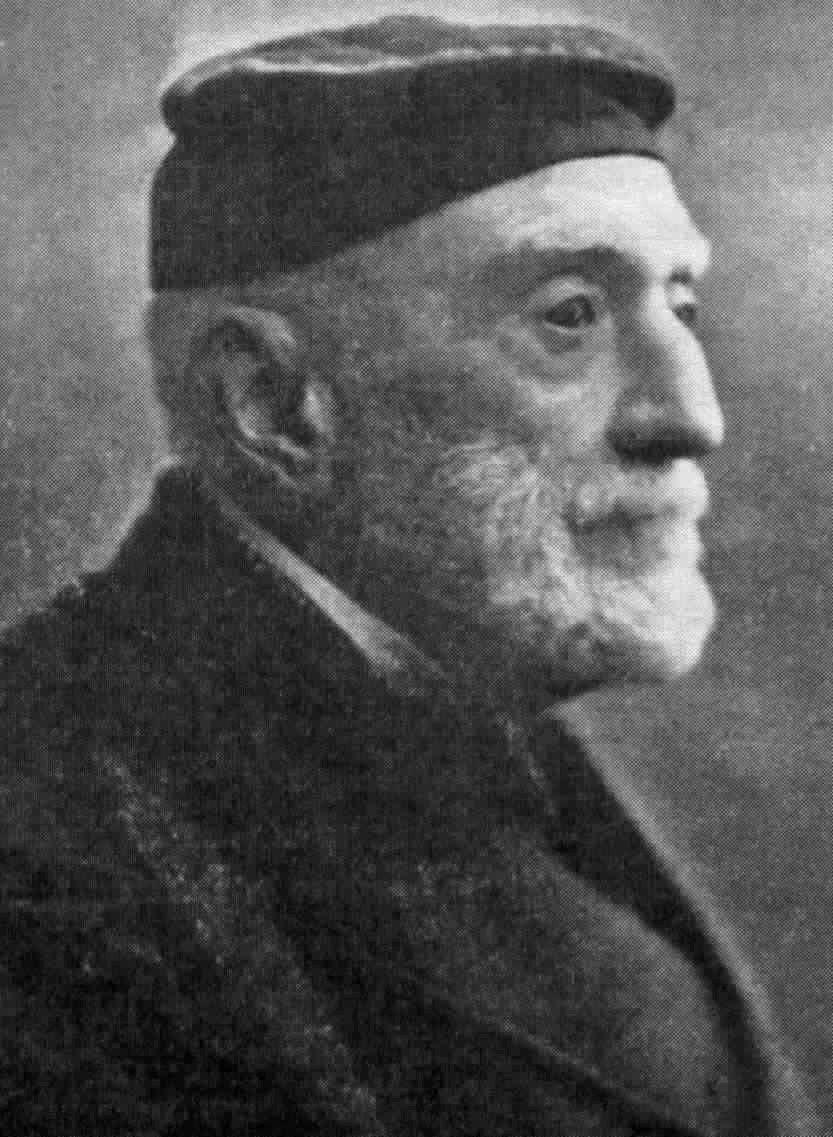
Henry Faulds

Although fingerprint characteristics were studied as far back as the mid-1600s, the use of fingerprints as a means of identification did not occur until the mid-19th century. In roughly 1859, Sir William James Herschel discovered that fingerprints remain stable over time and are unique across individuals; as Chief Magistrate of the Hooghly district in Jungipoor, India, in 1877 he was the first to institute the use of fingerprints and handprints as a means of identification, signing legal documents, and authenticating transactions. The fingerprint records collected at this time were used for one-to-one verification only; as a means in which records would be logically filed and searched had not yet been invented.

In 1880, Dr. Henry Faulds wrote to Charles Darwin, explaining a system for classifying fingerprints, asking for his assistance in their development. Darwin was unable to assist Dr. Faulds, but agreed to forward the letter to his cousin, Sir Francis Galton. Dr. Henry Faulds and Sir Francis Galton did not engage in much correspondence, but in the following decade, they devised very similar fingerprint classification systems. It is unclear whom to credit for the classification system. However, we do know that Dr. Henry Faulds was the first European to publish the notion of scientific use of fingerprints in the identification of criminals. In 1892, Sir Francis Galton published his highly influential book, Finger Prints in which he described his classification system that include three main fingerprint patterns – loops, whorls and arches.

At the time, the alternative to fingerprints was Bertillonage, also known as Anthropometry. Developed by Alphonse Bertillon in 1879, Bertillonage consists of a meticulous method of measuring body parts for the use of identifying criminals. In 1892, the British Indian police force adopted Anthropometry. Two years later, Sir Edward Henry, Inspector General of the Bengali Police in India became interested in the use of fingerprints for the use of criminal identification.

Influenced by Galton's Finger Prints, the men corresponded regularly in 1894; and in January 1896, Henry ordered the Bengali Police to collect prisoners’ fingerprints in addition to their anthropometric measurements. Expanding on Galton's classification system, he developed the Henry Classification System between the years 1896 and 1925. He was primarily assisted by Qazi Azizul Haque and Hem Chandra Bose. Qazi Azizul Haque developed a mathematical formula to supplement Henry's idea of sorting in 1024 pigeon holes based on fingerprint patterns, and Hem Chandra Bose introduced various improvements in the method of sub-classifying fingerprints. Both, on the recommendation of Henry, received recognition years later by the British Government for their contribution. The Henry Classification System was to find worldwide acceptance in 1899. In 1897 a commission was established to compare Anthropometry to the Henry Classification System. As the results were overwhelmingly in favor of fingerprints, fingerprinting was introduced to British India by the Governor-general, and in 1900, replaced Anthropometry. Also in 1900, Henry was sent to Natal, South Africa to assist in the reorganization of the local police force and establish a fingerprint bureau. His efforts in South Africa were highly successful; and in 1901 Sir Edward Henry returned to Britain and was appointed Assistant Commissioner of Scotland Yard, head of the Criminal Investigation Department (CID). In the same year, the first UK fingerprint bureau was established at Scotland Yard.(Met),(Early)

== Explanation ==
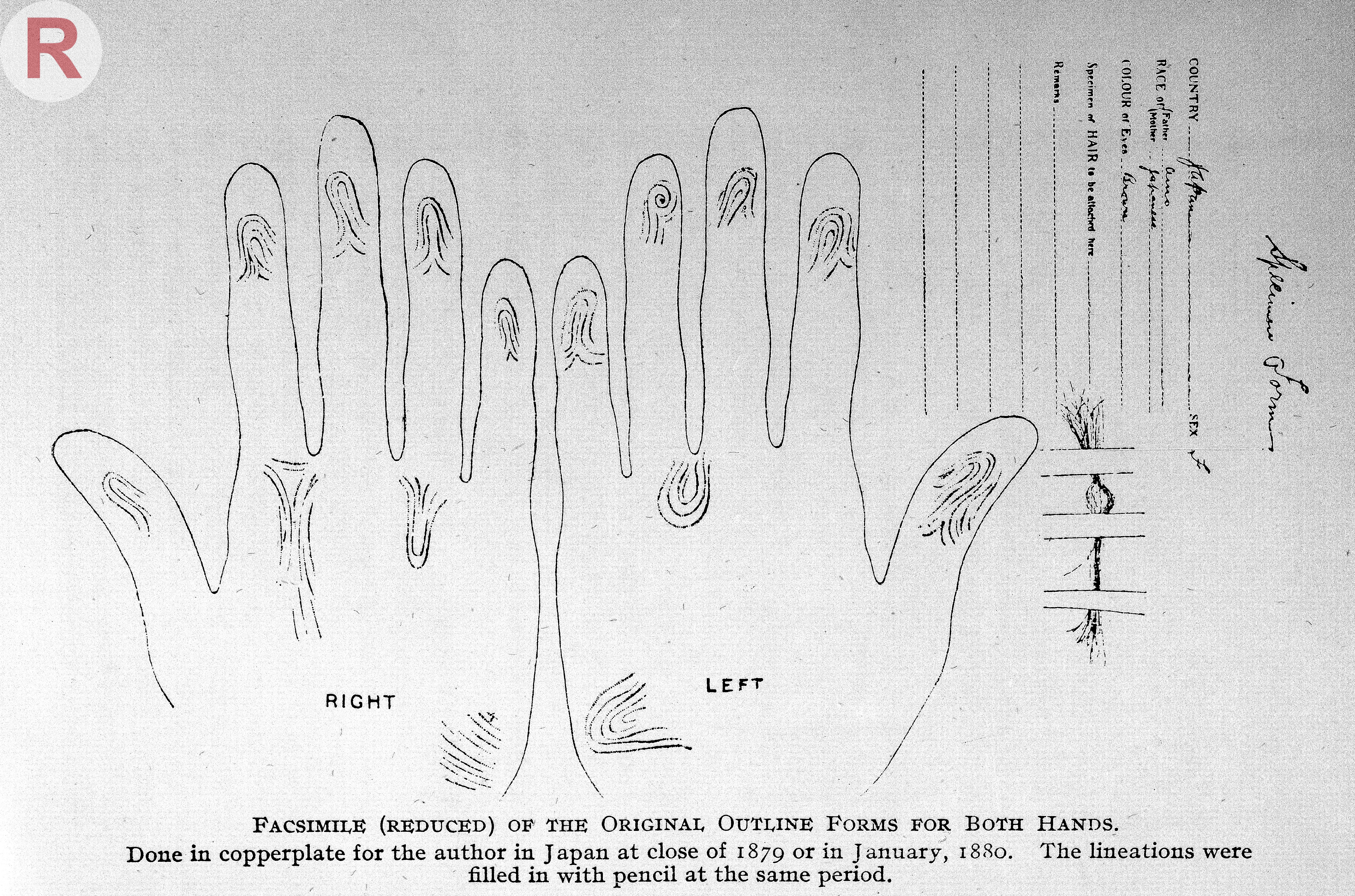
Facsimile of outline of two palms (FAULDS, Henry. Dactylography or the study of finger-prints. Imprint Halifax: Milner, [1912?]).

The Henry Classification System allows for logical categorization of ten-print fingerprint records into primary groupings based on fingerprint pattern types. This system reduces the effort necessary to search large numbers of fingerprint records by classifying fingerprint records according to gross physiological characteristics. Subsequent searches (manual or automated) utilizing granular characteristics such as minutiae are greatly simplified. The Henry Classification System is a method to classify fingerprints and exclude potential candidates. This system should never be used for individualization.

The Henry Classification System assigns each finger a number according to the order in which it is located in the hand, beginning with the right thumb as number 1 and ending with the left pinky as number 10. The system also assigns a numerical value to fingers that contain a whorl pattern; fingers 1 and 2 each have a value of 16, fingers 3 and 4 have a value of 8, fingers 5 and 6 have a value of 4, fingers 7 and 8 have a value of 2, and the final two fingers having a value of 1. Fingers with a non-whorl pattern, such as an arch or loop pattern, have a value of zero. The sum of the even finger value is then calculated and placed in the numerator of a fraction. The sum of the odd finger values is placed in the denominator. The value of 1 is added to each sum of the whorls with the maximum obtainable on either side of the fraction being 32. Thus, the primary classification is a fraction between 1/1 to 32/32, where 1/1 would indicate no whorl patterns and 32/32 would mean that all fingers had whorl patterns.

Example of a Henry Classification:

| Key | Major | Primary | Secondary | Sub-Secondary | Final |
|---|---|---|---|---|---|
| 16 | M | 9 | R | IIO | 15 |
| | M | 2 | U | OOI | |

plus 34edg

Key- Ridge count first loop

Major- Value of the ridge counts or the tracings of fingers #1, #6

Primary- Summation of the value of: Whorl type patterns fingers (#2, #4, #6, #8, #10 for Numerator), (#1, #3, #5, #7, #9 for Denominator); Value of fingers as whorls: #1 & #2 (16), #3 & #4 (8), #5 & #6 (4), #7 & #8 (2), #9 & #10 (1); Plus 1 in both Numerator and Denominator.

Secondary- Pattern types in fingers #2 and #7, (U) Ulna Loop, (R) Radial Loop, (W) Whorl, and (A) Arch

Sub-Secondary- Value of ridge counts or tracing- fingers #2, #3, #4 in Numerator; #7, #8, #9 in Denominator.

Final- is the ridge count of the loops or whorls in both little fingers expressed in numbers. The right little is used as the numerator and the left little as the denominator. If a loop appears in one finger and a whorl in the other, enumerate both their ridge counts by treating the whorl as an ulnar loop.

== Impact on current biometric systems ==
The Henry Classification System has been a highly influential force in the formation of current IAFIS technology (Integrated Automated Fingerprint Identification System). When IAFIS solutions attempted to emulate the Henry process.

Up until the mid-1990s, it was not unusual for a state or city to continue to maintain its physical file of Henry-sorted fingerprint cards just in case a disaster occurred in the IAFIS. As processing speeds, network throughput capacities, and system reliability increased, it was no longer necessary for automated fingerprint matching to mirror what had been the manual processes.

IAFIS began to classify fingerprints according to the distance between the core and delta, minutiae locations, and pattern type, the latter being based on the Henry Classification System. Presently, there are some forensic AVIS solutions (e.g. state and local) that still employ a Henry Classification System based manual fingerprint filing. However, other than for legacy systems, the Henry Classification System is not essential for automated systems.

== Bibliography ==
- Harling 1996
- Roberts 2008
- Stewart 2014
- Carlton 2023
