= Qazi Azizul Haque =

Bengali police officer and inventor

- কাজি আজিজুল হক
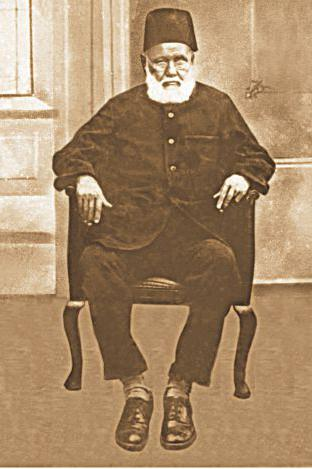
- Haque in Motihari, Bihar, in 1929
- Born: c. 1872; Paigram Kasba Village, Khulna District, Bengal, British India
- Died: 1935 (aged 62–63); Champaran, Bengal, British India
- Occupation: ·Inventor ·Policeman
- Notable work: Co-developer of the Henry Classification System

Khan Bahadur Qazi Azizul Haque (Bengali: কাজি আজিজুল হক; 1872–1935) was a Bengali inventor and police officer in British India (present-day Bangladesh), notable for his work with Edward Henry and Hem Chandra Bose in developing the Henry Classification System of fingerprints, which is still in use. Haque provided the mathematical basis for the system.

== Early life ==
Qazi Syed Azizul Haque was born into an aristocratic Bengali Muslim family of Syeds in 1872 in the village of Paigram Kasba in Khulna District. His ancestors were appointed as Qadi in the region, as they were originally Aristocratic Bengali Hindu Kayasthas,hence the family was also known as the Qazi family of Phultala. His parents died in a boat accident when he was young, this led his household to fall into financial hardship. He was known to have been an intelligent boy from a young age, as well as for being an avaricious eater, leading him to be frequently scolded by his older brother as the household was struggling with the cost of living. One day, when his older brother returned from work, he found that he had not only eaten his share of the food but also a significant portion of his brother's food. Azizul Haque's older brother became enraged and thrashed him. Heartbroken after this incident, he secretly left his family home at the age of 12 and went to Kolkata, where he befriended a family who became impressed with his mathematical skills and arranged for him to get a formal education.

== Education and police career ==
Haque studied mathematics and science at Presidency College, Kolkata. In 1892, Edward Henry of the Calcutta Police wrote to the college principal asking for the recommendation of a strong statistics student to help with his fingerprint project, and the principal nominated Haque. Henry recruited Haque as a police sub-inspector, and initially gave him the responsibility for instituting the anthropometric system in Bengal. Haque subsequently opted to join the Bihar Police Service when Bihar was separated from the Bengal Presidency.

== Fingerprinting ==
According to author Colin Beavan, Haque, dissatisfied with the anthropometric system proposed by Francis Galton, began to work on a classification system of his own. He devised a mathematical formula to sort slips into 1024 pigeonholes in thirty-two columns and thirty-two rows based on fingerprint patterns. Beavan further writes:

By 1897, Haque had collected 7000 fingerprint sets in his cabinet. His simple methods of further sub-classification, which were easier to learn and less prone to error than Galton's, meant that even a collection numbering in the hundreds of thousands could be divided into small groups of slips. As he predicted, his fingerprint sets, compared with anthropometric cards, were far less prone to error and could be classified and searched with much greater confidence. The registration of a convict or a search for his existing card took an hour under the anthropometric system, but only five minutes using Haque's classification of fingerprints.

Beavan goes on to say:

Haque's boss, Edward Henry saw that Haque's work would reflect well on him and asked the colonial government to convene a committee to evaluate the system for widespread use. The committee reported that fingerprints were superior to anthropometry "1. In simplicity of working; 2. In the cost of apparatus; 3. In the fact that all skilled work is transferred to a central or classification office; 4. In the rapidity with which the process can be worked; and 5. In the certainty or results. Fingerprints, in other words, were the new hero in criminal identification. (Beavan, page 142)

== Credit for discovery ==
=== History ===
According to Beavan, Henry would later "tell those who asked that it was he who had come up with the classification system in a sudden flash of inspiration on a train, when he had no paper and had to resort to noting his ideas on the shirt cuff." for his word of success, the fingerprint classification system was named the Henry Classification System.

Hem Chandra Bose, another Indian police officer who worked with Haque and Henry, subsequently contributed to the development of the telegraphic code system for fingerprints.

Years later, when Haque requested recognition and compensation from the British government for his contribution to fingerprint classification work, Henry did publicly acknowledge Haque's contribution, and would later do the same for Bose. G.S. Sodhi and Jasjeet Kaur published an extensive research paper on the issue of the two Indian police officers' contributions to fingerprint development. In their paper, they quote The Statesman, which published an article dated 28 February 1925 entitled, "Indian affairs in London", which stated, "A Muhammadan Sub-Inspector played an important and still insufficiently acknowledged part in fingerprint classification." Sodhi and Kaur quote several other sources to support Haque's contribution to fingerprint classification. For example, J.D. Sifton, Officiating Chief Secretary to the Government of Bihar and Orissa, wrote a letter (letter no. 761 PR, dated 15 June 1925): "Azizul Haque was... allowed to start research work upon a method of classifying finger prints, and after months of experiment he evolved his primary classification which convinced Sir E.R. Henry that the problem of providing an effective method of classifying fingerprints could be solved.

Thereafter the secondary and other classifications were evolved and the Khan Bahadur (Haque) played an important role in their conception." Henry, reportedly, when contacted to endorse a grant of honorarium to Haque, wrote in a letter dated 10 May 1926 to P.H. Dumbel, the then Secretary of the Services and General Department, India Office: "I wish to make clear that, in my opinion, he (Haque) contributed more than any other member of my staff and contributed in a conspicuous degree to bringing about the perfecting of a system of classification that has stood the test of time and has been accepted by most countries." At the time of final approval of the honorarium, the Home Department (Government of India) noted, "It appears from the information now received that he (Haque) was Sir Edward Henry's principal helper in perfecting the scheme and he actually himself devised the method of classification which is in universal use. He thus contributed most materially to a discovery which is of worldwide importance and has brought a great credit to the police of India."

On a subsequent request to comment on Bose, Henry wrote in 1930, "The Rai Bahadur (Bose)...has devoted the whole of his official life to perfecting the methods by which search is facilitated and as his labours have contributed materially to great credit."

=== Sengoopta's research ===
Chandak Sengoopta quotes Sir Douglas Gordon, a former Inspector-General of Police for Bengal from 1938 to 1942, from his letter to The Times in 1965 stating that Henry had "placed on special duty two Indian Inspectors to work out a formula or set of formulas which would enable prints to be classified.... This in due course they succeeded in doing and the result of their labours and ingenuity is the basis of the 'Henry' system which he brought with him to London when he was appointed Assistant Commissioner at Scotland Yard." Sengoopta went on to say, that Gordon "strongly implied that they (Haque and Bose) and not Henry created the classification. The full credit for the system, he (Gordon) declared, 'rests with the Bengal Police.'" Sengoopta further cites a letter to The Times from H.C. Mitchell, honorary secretary of the Indian Police (UK) Association, where Mitchell asserted, "that it had been Haque who, in 1897, had explained the classification to the government committee investigating the utility of fingerprinting." Michell, in that letter, further stressed that "the work of Azizul Haque and Hem Chandra Bose should be commemorated and that their names should be on record in India and in this country (UK)."

Sengoopta further narrates Mitchell's report of a presentation of an award by Henry to his assembled company of his former sub-inspectors on his visit to India in 1912 (whereby Henry accompanied King George V and Queen Mary to the Coronation Durbar in Delhi as a security advisor), where Henry, according to Mitchell, paid tribute to "Sub Inspector of Police, Khan Bahadur Azizul Haque-the man mainly responsible for the new world wide fingerprint system of identification." Sengoopta reports that "Haque received the title of Khan Shahib from the government in 1913 and that of Khan Bahadur in 1924. Similarly, Bose received the decoration Rai Shahib and Rai Bhadur - the Hindu counterparts of the honours received by Haque. Both also received honoraria of 5,000 rupees each for their contribution to the establishment of fingerprint classification" (Sengoopta, page 144).

=== Other Recent Mentions ===
Based on the evidence they gathered, Sodhi and Kaur published a book, Indian Civilization and the Science of Fingerprinting, in which they suggest that Henry's System of Fingerprint Classification be renamed the Henry-Haque-Bose System of Fingerprint Classification. While this has not yet transpired, their advocacy role, in collaboration with others, has resulted recently in the establishment, by the UK Fingerprint Society, of a research award in the names of Haque and Bose.

Haque's unique contribution to fingerprinting development technique is recently noted in an article by Clive Thompson in the April 2019 issue of Smithsonian magazine. Thompson, reviewing the history of the development of fingerprint science, noted that while other thinkers in the 19th century tried to create a method to categorize fingerprints, these other methods could not be quickly used to match a set of prints to a suspect. Thompson writes:

The breakthrough in matching prints came from Bengal, India. Azizul Haque, the head of identification for the local police department, developed an elegant system that categorized prints into subgroups based on their pattern types such as loops and whorls. It worked so well that a police office could find a match in only five minutes - much faster than the hour it would take to identify someone using the Bertillon body-measuring system. Soon Haque and his superior Edward Henry were using prints to identify repeat criminals in Bengal "hand over fist." When Henry demonstrated the system to the British government, officials were so impressed they made him assistant commissioner of Scotland Yard in 1901.

== Personal life ==
Upon retirement from the service, Haque settled in Motihari, Bihar Province, where he died and was buried.
