= SMARCAD1 =

Protein-coding gene in the species Homo sapiens

Identifiers
- Aliases: SMARCAD1, ADERM, ETL1, HEL1, SWI/SNF-related, matrix-associated actin-dependent regulator of chromatin, subfamily a, containing DEAD/H box 1, BASNS, HRZ
- External IDs: OMIM: 612761; MGI: 95453; GeneCards: SMARCAD1

Gene location (Human)
Chr.	Chromosome 4 (human)
Band	4q22.3	Start	94,207,611 bp
Band	4q22.3	End	94,291,292 bp

Gene location (Mouse)
Chr.	Chromosome 6 (mouse)
Band	6 C1|6 30.11 cM	Start	65,019,567 bp
Band	6 C1|6 30.11 cM	End	65,093,045 bp
RNA expression pattern
Bgee	Human / Mouse (ortholog); Top expressed in: ganglionic eminence; tibia; secondary oocyte; pancreatic epithelial cell; ventricular zone; Achilles tendon; testicle; skin of thigh; visceral pleura; parietal pleura / Top expressed in: genital tubercle; morula; tail of embryo; ganglionic eminence; ventricular zone; medial ganglionic eminence; blastocyst; superior cervical ganglion; zygote; abdominal wall; More reference expression data
BioGPS	n/a
Gene ontology
Molecular function	DNA binding; nucleotide binding; helicase activity; protein binding; nucleic acid binding; hydrolase activity; ATP binding; chromatin binding; ATP-dependent activity, acting on DNA
Cellular component	site of double-strand break; nuclear matrix; nuclear replication fork; nucleoplasm; chromosome; heterochromatin; nucleus
Biological process	regulation of DNA recombination; histone H3 deacetylation; chromatin remodeling; DNA double-strand break processing; nucleotide metabolic process; cellular response to DNA damage stimulus; positive regulation of transcription, DNA-templated; chromosome separation; histone H4 deacetylation; protein homooligomerization; DNA repair; chromatin organization
Sources:Amigo / QuickGO
Orthologs
Databases	NCBI: entry; OMA: entry
Species	Human	Mouse
Entrez	56916	13990
Ensembl	ENSG00000163104	ENSMUSG00000029920
UniProt	Q9H4L7	Q04692
RefSeq (mRNA)	NM_001128429; NM_001128430; NM_001254949; NM_020159	NM_001253392; NM_007958; NM_001355248; NM_001355249; NM_001355250
RefSeq (protein)	NP_001121901; NP_001121902; NP_001241878; NP_064544; NP_001362784 NP_001362785; NP_001362786; NP_001362787; NP_001362788	NP_001240321; NP_031984; NP_001342177; NP_001342178; NP_001342179
Location (UCSC)	Chr 4: 94.21 – 94.29 Mb	Chr 6: 65.02 – 65.09 Mb
PubMed search
- Wikidata
View/Edit Human	View/Edit Mouse

SWI/SNF-related matrix-associated actin-dependent regulator of chromatin subfamily A containing DEAD/H box 1 is a protein that in humans is encoded by the SMARCAD1 gene.

Proper expression of SMARCAD1 may be important to fingerprint development, and the disruption of its expression is believed to cause adermatoglyphia, the absence of fingerprints.
