= Adermatoglyphia =

Rare genetic disorder causing lack of fingerprints

- Other names: Immigration delay disease
- Adermatoglyphia is inherited in an autosomal dominant manner

Adermatoglyphia is an extremely rare genetic disorder that prevents the development of fingerprints. Five extended families worldwide are known to be affected by this condition.

The disorder was informally nicknamed "immigration delay disease" by Professor Peter Itin after his first patient had trouble traveling to the U.S. without any fingerprints for identification.

== Case study ==
In 2007 an isolated finding was published regarding the description of a person from Switzerland who lacked fingerprints. The phenotype was mapped to chromosome 4q22. In the splice-site of a 3' exon of the gene for SMARCAD1-helicase, a point mutation was detected. It results in a shortened form of the skin-specific protein. The heterozygous expression of the mutation suggests an autosomal dominant mode of inheritance. The Swiss patient, and eight of her relatives who also had the mutation, all had "flat finger pads and a reduced number of sweat glands in the hands".

Other conditions can cause a lack of fingerprints, but unlike them, adermatoglyphia has no side effects.

== In popular culture ==
The medical condition and the 2007 Swiss medical case are both mentioned in the episode titled "She Was Murdered Twice" of the police drama television series Death in Paradise.

Israeli author Sarah Blau revealed in an interview that she was born with the disorder.
