= Bhaskar Kumar Ghosh =

Indian-American statistician

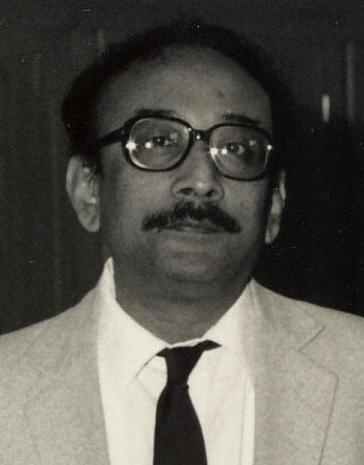
B.K. Ghosh 1986

Bhaskar Kumar Ghosh (February 10, 1936 in Calcutta, India -August 3, 2008 in Bethlehem, Pennsylvania, USA) was an Indian-American statistician especially known for his contributions to sequential analysis.

== Life and career ==
Ghosh was born in Calcutta, India, on February 10, 1936. During 1951 to 1955 he studied at the Presidency College of the University of Calcutta, the last two years being in the Statistics Honours BSc Program. There he received his first degree (Bachelor of Science, BSc) in statistics. During 1955 to 1959 he continued his studies of statistics in the PhD–program of the University College London. With his dissertation "Sequential Analysis of Components of Variance in Hierarchical Classifications", supervised by Norman Lloyd Johnson, he earned his PhD in 1959. Then he worked as a research assistant at the University College London, as Statistician in the Atomic Power Consortium, London, and during 1960/61 as an assistant professor of mathematics at Chelsea College London. Jointly with Harold Adolph Freeman he completed a monograph "An Introduction to Sequential Experimentation", published 1961 as a US Army Technical Report.

In 1961, Ghosh moved to the US and joined the Mathematics Department, Lehigh University, Bethlehem, Pennsylvania. There he worked until he retired in 2005, first as an assistant and as an associate professor, from 1968 on as a Full Professor of Mathematics. Although he published a series of interesting papers on distribution theory, density estimators etc. he was best known for his work on sequential analysis: International recognition found his monograph "Sequential Tests of Statistical Hypotheses". In 1982, he founded, jointly with Pranab Kumar Sen (University of North Carolina, Chapel Hill), the journal "Sequential Analysis" and served as Co-Editor until 1995. Also jointly with P.K. Sen, he published in 1991 the "Handbook of Sequential Analysis"; the emphasis was to cover most of the major developments of that theory (until 1990).

In 1968, Ghosh was visiting associate professor at MIT and 1978/1980 visiting professor of statistics at Virginia Tech. In 1986, he received, from the Alexander von Humboldt Foundation (Germany), the Humboldt Prize (Senior U.S. Scientific Award), which allowed him to work as Guest Professor of Mathematical Statistics at the University of Münster (Germany) during 1986/87 and again in 1992. Ghosh was Fellow of the Institute of Mathematical Statistics and of the Royal Statistical Society.

== Books ==
- with H.A. Freeman: An Introduction to Sequential Experimentation, U.S. Army Technical Report, Fort Lee, Virginia 1961
- with L. West und J.L. Sanders: Tables for Sequential Analysis of Variance, U.S. Army Technical Report, Fort Lee, Virginia 1967
- Sequential Tests of Statistical Hypotheses, Reading: Addison-Wesley 1970
- with P.K. Sen: Handbook of Sequential Analysis, New York: Dekker 1991

A complete list of Ghosh's publications, provided by Bennett Eisenberg and Nitis Mukhopadhyay, is contained in Sequential Analysis, Vol. 29 (2010), p. 41-43.
