= Per-comparison error rate =

In statistics, per-comparison error rate (PCER) is the probability of a Type I error in the absence of any multiple hypothesis testing correction. This is a liberal error rate relative to the false discovery rate and family-wise error rate, in that it is always less than or equal to those rates.
