= Government database =

Information collected by a state

A government database collects information for various reasons, including climate monitoring, securities law compliance, geological surveys, patent applications and grants, surveillance, national security, border control, law enforcement, public health, voter registration, vehicle registration, social security, and statistics.

== Canada ==
- National DNA Data Bank, a system established under the DNA Identification Act of 1998 to hold DNA profiles of persons convicted of designated offenses and DNA profiles obtained from crime scenes. Profiles may only be used for law enforcement purposes. At the end of September 2013 the National DNA Data Bank held 277,590 profiles in the Convicted Offender Index and 88,892 profiles in the Crime Scene Index with from 500 to 600 new samples received each week.
- Government Electronic Directory Services, a directory of Canadian federal public servants throughout the country, including names, titles, telephone and facsimile numbers, departmental names, office locations, and e-mail addresses for some public servants.
- Homeless Individuals and Families Information System, a free client management application created in 1995 to assist service providers in managing their operations and collecting information about the population using homeless shelters, client bookings, provision of goods and services, housing placement, and case management. Its data may be exported and incorporated into the National Homelessness Information System. Personal identifiers are replaced by unique, encrypted identifiers before the data is exported to ensure that client information is and remains anonymous.
- National Homelessness Information System, a database system designed to collect and analyze baseline data on the use of homeless shelters in Canada. It includes anonymized data imported from Homeless Individuals and Families Information System systems as well as data shared by some cities and provinces that do not use that system.
- System for Electronic Document Analysis and Retrieval, a filing system developed for the Canadian Securities Administrators to facilitate the electronic filing of securities information, allow for the public dissemination of Canadian securities information collected in the securities filing process, and provide electronic communication between electronic filers, agents and the Canadian Securities Administrator.

== European Union ==
- Eurodac system, a computerised central database established in December 2000 for comparing fingerprints of asylum seekers and some categories of illegal immigrants and a system for electronic data transmission between EU countries and the database. The database contains fingerprints, EU country of origin, sex, place and date of asylum application or apprehension of the person, reference number, date fingerprints were taken, and the date when the data was transmitted.
- Data Retention Directive, a directive passed by the legislative body of the European Union on 15 December 2005 that requires telecommunication operators to retain metadata (type of service, date, time, and size or duration, sender and receiver addresses, ..., but not the audio, video, or digital content) for telephone, Internet, and other telecommunication services for periods of not less than six months and not more than two years from the date of the communication as determined by each EU member state and, upon request, to make the data available to various governmental bodies. Access to this information is not limited to investigation of serious crimes, nor is a warrant required for access. The Data Protection Directive regulates the processing of personal data within the European Union.

=== Denmark ===
- Central DNA Profile Register, a register that contains DNA profiles for suspects and people convicted of offences that could lead to a prison sentence of 1.5 years or more as well as profiles from crime scenes. DNA profile information can be exchanged with other EU member states through Interpol.
- Civil Registration System (Det Centrale Personregister), a nationwide centralised register of personal information established in 1968 and used by virtually every government agency in Denmark. It contains names, addresses, Danish personal identification numbers, dates and places of birth, citizenship, and other associated information.
- Danish National Biobank and National Biobank Registry, two elements of an initiative to allow researchers to link data from individual Danish national registers with information extracted from more than 15 million biological samples anonymously. The National Biobank Registry gives researchers on-line access to combined data from all the biobanks participating in the Danish National Biobank initiative, including the Danish National Birth Cohort, the Danish Neonatal Screening Biobank, the Danish Patobank, the Danish Cancer Society's project biobank "Kost, kræft og helbred (Diet, Cancer and Health)", the DNB biobank at Rigshospitalet (Copenhagen University Hospital), and the Cancer biobanks (de Kliniske Kræftbiobanker). The National Biobank Registry will link information from the individual biobanks with disease codes and demographic information from individual national registries, including the Danish Civil Registration System, the Danish National Patient Register, and the Danish Pathology Register. By searching the National Biobank Registry it will be possible to look up the number of biological specimens available for patients with a certain diagnosis.
- Danish Neonatal Screening Biobank, blood samples from people born after 1976, kept at the Statens Serum Institut to test for Phenylketonuria and other diseases, and for DNA tests to identify deceased and suspected criminals. Parents can request that the blood sample of their newborn be destroyed after the result of the test is known.

=== France ===
- Carnet B: Created in 1886, the Carnet B was, initially, a list of foreigners suspected of espionage. Prior to World War I, the list was gradually expanded to include all persons likely to disturb public order and antimilitarists who might oppose national mobilization. Those listed were to be arrested in the event of war. In July 1914 the list contained 2,481 names. However, after the assassination of socialist leader and committed antimilitarist Jean Jaurès a few days before the start of World War I, most of the left-wing rallied to the Union sacrée (Sacred Union) government and Carnet B was not used to detain individuals. The maintenance and use of Carnet B was discontinued on 18 July 1947.
- Tulard database: In the interwar period, police officer André Tulard set up a database registering communists and others activists. The database was used under Vichy to register Jews. These files were given to Theodor Dannecker of the Gestapo and greatly assisted the French police in carrying out raids against Jews, who were then interned at Drancy camp before being deported to concentration camps in Nazi Germany.
- INSEE code: During the World War II, René Carmille created what would become the INSEE code used as a national identification number for people, organizations, and administrative regions. INSEE is the acronym for the French National Institute for Statistics and Economic Studies.
- Répertoire national d’identification des personnes physiques: a national directory for the identification of natural persons, maintained by INSEE since 1946. It is regularly updated through statistical bulletins on civil status changes, drawn up and sent to INSEE by municipalities and containing details of births, deaths, recognitions and marginal notes made in birth certificates for persons born in metropolitan France or its overseas departments. The directory serves four purposes: (i) to eliminate confusion arising from people sharing the same name; (ii) use by tax authorities and pension funds to verify the civil status of individuals; (iii) contributing to health monitoring by sending daily information on deaths to the Institute for Health Monitoring; and (iv) generating demographic statistics to assist in decision-making. It includes information on the civil status of citizens: family name, sometimes the usual name (or marital name), given names, gender, date and place of birth, number of birth certificate, date and place of death and death certificate number for the recently deceased, and national registration number. The National System of Management of the Identities managed by Caisse Nationale d'Assurance Vieillesse, the social security pension administrator, is a copy of this data.
- Système Automatisé pour les Fichiers Administratifs et le Répertoire des Individus (SAFARI): an "Automated System for Administrative Files and Directories of Individuals" was to have been a centralized database of personal data collected from many administrative departments and connected using the INSEE code. The massive popular rejection of this project after it became known to the public promoted the creation of the Commission nationale de l'informatique et des libertés (CNiL) to ensure data privacy. Databases are to have the CNiL's approbation before being authorized. In 2006 more than half the police records overseen by the CNiL were found to contain mistakes which required correction.
- Système de traitement des infractions constatées (STIC): a "Processing System for Recognized Offences" to register criminal offenders and plaintiffs was created in 1995 and legalized in 2001. In January 1997 it held the records of records of 2.5 million offenders and 2.7 million victims. In 2006 the STIC held 24.4 million records. Records are held for a maximum of 40 years. The STIC has sparked several controversies, as some people have not been able to find jobs because they were registered in the STIC (sometimes wrongly, others simply as victims). In 2005 the CNiL discovered errors in 47% of the records included in the STIC database.
- JUDEX: a system to register criminal offenders and plaintiffs used by the Gendarmerie is similar to the STIC. JUDEX contained 2.2 million records in 2003.
- Fichier national automatisé des empreintes génétiques (Automated National File of Genetic Prints) for registering DNA information, was created in 1998. First used to register sex offenders, it has since been extended to cover almost any crime, including protestors engaged in civil disobedience. It has grown from 2,807 profiles in 2003, to 330,000 in 2006, and 1.27 million in 2009.
- Fichier judiciaire automatisé des auteurs d'infractions sexuelles: The Automated Criminal File of Sex Offenders, is a sex offender database operated by the Justice Minister created in 2004. The database records the name, sex, date and place of birth, nationality, alias, address, nature of the offense, date and place where the offense was committed, nature and date of the decision, and penalties or measures imposed. In October 2008 the database contained records for some 43,408 people.
- Base-élèves system: the Students-Base system, a database containing personal data on children age three and older and their families, including psychosocial data and information on competence, skills, and problems. Although initially accessed by educators and social actors, the new French law of March 2007 for the prevention of delinquency granted access to such information to Mayors for the purpose of preventing delinquency. However, after protests, data related to citizenship, language, and culture of origin were removed in October 2007. The Conseil d'État, the highest administrative jurisdiction, held in two decisions of 19 July 2010 that the "Base-élèves" and the computerised file of student identifiers ("Base nationale des identifiants des élèves") were not functioning in compliance with the Data Protection Act. Further, the Conseil déetat considered that the collection of health data in the "Base-élèves" relating to children was not relevant and reminded in its decisions that parents have a right to object to the collection and processing of their children's data. It also held that the retention period of 35 years for the children identifiers contained in the database was excessive.
- ELOI index: short for l’éloignement (removal), the ELOI index is a register for foreigners and illegal aliens created by the Interior Minister in 2006 and subsequently declared illegal by the Conseil d'État.
- Parafes: A 7 August 2007 decree generalized a voluntary biometric profiling program of travellers in airports using fingerprints. The new database would be interconnected with the Schengen Information System (SIS) as well as with a national database of wanted persons (Fichier des personnes recherchées). The CNiL protested against this new decree, opposing itself to the recording of fingerprints and to the interconnection between the two systems.
- Loppsi II: In February 2010, the French Parliament adopted the Loppsi II "bill on direction and planning for the performance of domestic security", a far-reaching security bill that modernizes Internet laws, criminalizes online identity theft, allows police to tap Internet connections as well as phone lines during investigations, and targets child pornography by ordering ISPs to filter Internet connections. The law permits the creation of an informatic platform connecting numerous government databases. Previously, in 2004, the National Assembly voted the loi pour la confiance dans l'économie numérique to implement the Electronic Commerce EU directive. This law requires all Internet service providers (ISPs), phone operators, webmasters, etc., to keep information on visitors (codewords, VISA cards numbers, pseudonyms, contributions on forums and blogs, etc.) for from one to three years. The information is to be made available for use by the RG domestic intelligence agency, counter-intelligence agencies, the judicial police (PJ) and investigative magistrates.
- Fingerprints: In a decision delivered on 18 April 2013, the European Court of Human Rights found that a 1987 French Decree related to storing fingerprint data is a privacy violation because:
  - the scope of the Decree is not limited to certain serious crimes, such as sexual offences or organised crime, but includes all offences, even the minor ones;
  - the database did not distinguish between those data subjects who were convicted and those who were not, nor did it make a distinction on whether the data subjects had been officially charged; and
  - the maximum data retention period of 25 years was disproportionate to the legitimate purpose of the Decree.

=== Germany ===
- Germany set up its national DNA database for the German Federal Police (BKA) in 1998.

In late 2010, the database contained DNA profiles of over 700,000 individuals and in September 2016 it contained 1,162,304 entries.

=== Schengen area ===
- Schengen Information System (SIS), a database system used by 27 European countries to maintain and distribute information on individuals and property of interest for national security, border control, and law enforcement purposes. The countries using the system in 2013 are the five original participants (Belgium, France, Germany, Luxembourg, and the Netherlands), twenty additional countries (Austria, the Czech Republic, Denmark, Estonia, Finland, Greece, Hungary, Iceland, Italy, Latvia, Lithuania, Malta, Norway, Poland, Portugal, Slovakia, Slovenia, Spain, Sweden, and Switzerland), as well as two countries (Ireland and the United Kingdom) that participate under the terms of the Treaty of Amsterdam. The database contains more than 46 million entries, called alerts, mostly dealing with lost identity documents. Person alerts comprise roughly 885,000 of the entries (1.9%). The person alerts include: first and last names; middle initial, aliases, date of birth, sex, nationality, is the person armed and/or violent, reason for the alert, and the action to be taken if person is encountered. The remainder of the database contains alerts relating to lost, stolen, or misappropriated property, including: firearms, identity documents, blank identity documents, motor vehicles, and banknotes. SIS does not record travellers' entries into or exits from the Schengen Area or individual countries, although 14 Schengen participants have separate national databases which do record travellers' entries and exits.

=== Switzerland ===
- In 1989 the Secret files scandal revealed that the Bundespolizei had secretly and illegally kept more than 900,000 files on both Swiss citizens and foreigners in secret archives. With a population of approximately 7 million, that meant that almost one out of every seven citizens had been under surveillance.
- In 2002 a Swiss national DNA database was created to hold DNA samples taken from crime scenes and from suspects accused of committing serious crimes. In 2006 Switzerland had the fifth largest DNA database in Europe, behind England, Germany, Scotland and Austria.

=== United Kingdom ===
Various government bodies maintain databases about citizens and residents of the United Kingdom. Under the Data Protection Act 1998 and the Protection of Freedoms Act 2012, legal provisions exist that control and restrict the collection, storage, retention, and use of information in government databases.

==== Active ====
- National Fingerprint Database: British Police hold 6.5 million fingerprint records in a searchable database called IDENT1. There is increasing use of roadside fingerprinting - using new police powers to check identity. Concerns have been raised over the unregulated use of biometrics in schools, affecting young children. On 4 December 2008, the European Court of Human Rights (ECHR) ruled that the UK Government's policy of retaining fingerprints of individuals suspected, but then not convicted, of a crime was a breach of the Article 8 Right to respect for private and family life that could not be justified on the grounds of the prevention of disorder or crime.
- National DNA Database: Over 3.4 million DNA samples are on file in the National DNA Database. DNA data is shared across borders through data-sharing agreements through the European Union and other international organizations. On 4 December 2008, the European Court of Human Rights (ECHR) ruled that the UK Government's policy of retaining DNA samples and profiles of individuals suspected, but then not convicted, of a crime was a breach of the Article 8 Right to respect for private and family life that could not be justified on the grounds of the prevention of disorder or crime.
- Public transport: In London, the Oyster card payment system can track the movement of individual people through the public transport system, although an anonymous option is available, while the London congestion charge uses computer imaging to track car number plates.
- Road vehicle movement tracking: Across the country efforts have been increasingly under way to track closely all road vehicle movements, initially using a nationwide network of roadside cameras connected to automatic number plate recognition systems. These have tracked, recorded, and stored the details of all journeys undertaken on major roads and through city centres and the information is stored for five years. In the longer term mandatory onboard vehicle telematics systems are also suggested, to facilitate road charging (see vehicle excise duty). Part 2, Chapter 1 of the Protection of Freedoms Act 2012 creates a new regulation for, and instructs the Secretary of State to prepare a code of practice towards, closed-circuit television and automatic number plate recognition.
- Telephone and Internet surveillance: In 2008 plans were being made to collect data on people's phone, e-mail and web-browsing habits and were expected to be included in the Communications Data Bill. The "giant database" would include telephone numbers dialed, the websites visited and addresses to which e-mails are sent "but not the content of e-mails or telephone conversations."
- Law Enforcement Data Service (LEDS): This will be a merging of the Police National Computer (PNC) and Police National Database (PND) in 2020. Police Databases on Liberty.
- Database of rogue landlords: Information available from gov.uk Database of rogue landlords and property agents under the Housing and Planning Act 2016

==== Disbanded ====
- National Identity Register: On 21 December 2010 the Identity Documents Act 2010 received Royal Assent. The Act repealed the Identity Cards Act 2006, scrapping the mandatory ID card scheme and associated National Identity Register (including ContactPoint) that had been in use on a limited or voluntary basis since November 2008, but which was never fully implemented. Foreign nationals from outside the European Union, however, continue to require an ID card for use as a biometric residence permit under the provisions of the UK Borders Act 2007 and the Borders, Citizenship and Immigration Act 2009. The National Identity Register was officially destroyed on 10 February 2011 when the final 500 hard drives containing the register were shredded.

== India ==
NATGRID: India is setting up a national intelligence grid called NATGRID, which will become operational in 2013. NATGRID would allow access to each individual's data ranging from land records, Internet logs, air and rail PNR, phone records, gun records, driving license, property records, insurance, and income tax records in real time and with no oversight. With a UID from the Unique Identification Authority of India being given to every Indian from February 2011, the government would be able track people in real time. A national population registry of all citizens will be established by the 2011 census, during which fingerprints and iris scans would be taken along with GPS records of each household. Access to the combined data will be given to 11 agencies, including the Research and Analysis Wing, the Intelligence Bureau, the Enforcement Directorate, the National Investigation Agency, the Central Bureau of Investigation, the Directorate of Revenue Intelligence and the Narcotics Control Bureau.

== Interpol ==
- Interpol's DNA database profiles, shared by 49 countries.
- Interpol fingerprint database, a database containing more than 160,000 fingerprint records submitted by its member countries. These fingerprints are collected from crime scenes, and from known and suspected criminals.

== Russia ==
- SORM and SORM-2, technical systems from 1996 and 1998 that allow searching and surveillance of telephone and Internet communications.

== Pakistan ==
- NADRA, The National Database & Registration Authority (NADRA) was established on 10 March 2000. Nadra is also responsible to issuing the computerized national identity cards and Passports to the citizens of Pakistan.

== United States ==
- National ID card: The United States does not have a national ID card, in the sense that there is no federal agency with nationwide jurisdiction that directly issues such cards to all American citizens for mandatory regular use.
- Passport: The only national photo identity documents are the passport and passport card, which are issued to U.S. nationals only upon voluntary application.
- Social Security number: The vast majority of, but not all, Americans have a Social Security number because it is required for many purposes including employment, federal child tax deductions, and financial transactions. Social security numbers have become a de facto standard for uniquely identifying people in government and private databases. The Numerical Identification System (Numident) is the Social Security Administration's computer database file of an abstract of the information contained in an application for a Social Security number (Form SS-5). It contains the name of the applicant, place and date of birth, and other information. The Numident file contains all Social Security numbers since they first were issued in 1936.
- Social Security Death Index: a database of death records created from the U.S. Social Security Administration's Death Master File Extract. Most persons who have died since 1936 who had a Social Security Number and whose death has been reported to the Social Security Administration are listed in this index. The database includes given name and surname, and since the 1990s, middle initial; date of birth; month and year of death, or full date of death for accounts active in 2000 or later; social security number, state or territory where the social security number was issued; and zip code of the last place of residence while the person was alive. The index is frequently updated; the version of June 22, 2011 contained 89,835,920 records.
- Driver's licenses: these are issued by state departments of motor vehicles and registries of motor vehicles, and are the most common form of identification in the United States; the issuing agencies maintain databases of drivers, including photographs and addresses. States also issue voluntary identification cards to non-drivers, who are then also included in the motor vehicle department or registry of motor vehicle databases. Although most American adults carry their driver's license at all times when they are outside their homes, there is no legal requirement that they must be carrying their license when not operating a vehicle. In 2005, the U.S. Congress passed the REAL ID Act, which gives the Department of Homeland Security the power to regulate the design and content of all state driver's licenses, and to require that all of the underlying state databases be linked into a single national database.
- Mail Isolation Control and Tracking: Under the Mail Isolation Control and Tracking program, the U.S. Postal Service photographs the exterior of every piece of paper mail that is processed in the United States — about 160 billion pieces in 2012. The Postmaster General stated that the system is primarily used for mail sorting, but the images are available for possible use by law enforcement agencies. There is no centralized database containing all of the images, instead each of the more than 200 mail processing centers around the country keeps the images of the mail it scans. The images are retained for a week to 30 days and then destroyed. The program was created in 2001 following the anthrax attacks that killed five people.
- Integrated Automated Fingerprint Identification System (IAFIS): a national automated fingerprint identification and criminal history system maintained by the Federal Bureau of Investigation (FBI). The Integrated Automated Fingerprint Identification System provides automated fingerprint search capabilities, latent searching capability, electronic image storage, and electronic exchange of fingerprints and responses. IAFIS is the largest biometric database in the world, housing the fingerprints and criminal histories of 70 million subjects in the criminal master file, 31 million civil prints and fingerprints from 73,000 known and suspected terrorists processed by the U.S. or by international law enforcement agencies. Fingerprints are voluntarily submitted to the FBI by local, state, and federal law enforcement agencies. These agencies acquire the fingerprints through criminal arrests or from non-criminal sources, such as employment background checks and the US-VISIT program. The FBI has announced plans to replace IAFIS with a Next Generation Identification system.
- Combined DNA Index System (CODIS): a tiered set of databases at the local, state, and national levels. The tiered architecture allows crime laboratories to control their own data—each laboratory decides which profiles it will share with the rest of the country. State law governs which specific crimes are eligible for CODIS. A record in the CODIS database, known as a CODIS DNA profile, consists of an individual's DNA profile, together with the sample's identifier and an identifier of the laboratory responsible for the profile. CODIS does not contain any personal identity information, such as names, dates of birth, or social security numbers. CODIS consists of the Convicted Offender Index (profiles of individuals convicted of crimes), the Forensic Index (profiles developed from biological material found at crime-scenes), the Arrestee Index, the Missing or Unidentified Persons Index, and the Missing Persons Reference Index. As of 2006, approximately 180 laboratories in all 50 states participate in CODIS. At the national level, the National DNA Index System, is operated by the FBI. As of August 2013 the National DNA System contained over 10,535,300 offender profiles, 1,613,100 arrestee profiles, and 509,900 forensic profiles and has produced over 219,700 hits, assisting in more than 210,700 investigations. The National Institute of Justice's International Center promotes information sharing with other similar Institutes worldwide.
- Investigative Data Warehouse: a searchable database containing intelligence and investigative data to support the FBI's counter-terrorism, counter-intelligence, and law enforcement missions. The Investigative Data Warehouse was created in 2004 to centralize multiple federal and state databases, including criminal records from various law enforcement agencies, the U.S. Department of the Treasury’s Financial Crimes Enforcement Network (FinCEN), and public records databases. According to the FBI's website, as of 22 August 2007, the database contained 700 million records from 53 databases and was accessible by 13,000 individuals around the world. The FBI was the subject of a 2006 lawsuit brought by the Electronic Frontier Foundation (EFF) because of a lack of public notice describing their Investigative Data Warehouse and the criteria for including personal information, as required by the Privacy Act of 1974.
- Project MINARET watch lists: Between 1967 and 1973, under Project MINARET, the National Security Agency (NSA) searched intercepted overseas telephone calls and cable traffic for the names of individuals and organizations on watch lists predesignated by government law enforcement and intelligence organizations. When a match was found, the intercepted communication was passed to the Federal Bureau of Investigation (FBI), Central Intelligence Agency (CIA), Secret Service, Bureau of Narcotics and Dangerous Drugs (BNDD), the Department of Defense, and the White House. There was no judicial oversight and the project obtained no warrants for the interceptions. Over 5,925 foreigners and 1,690 organizations and U.S. citizens were included on the watch lists and over 3,900 reports were issued on watch-listed Americans.
- NSA call database: Code named MAINWAY, the database, maintained by the National Security Agency (NSA), contains call detail information, but not the contents, for hundreds of billions of telephone calls made through the four largest telephone carriers in the United States: AT&T, SBC, BellSouth (all three now called AT&T), and Verizon. Launched early in 2001, the existence of the database was revealed in 2006. It is estimated that the database contains over 1.9 trillion call-detail records.
- TALON: a database created by the United States Air Force following the September 11, 2001 attacks to collect and evaluate information about possible threats to U.S. service members and civilian workers in the U.S. and at overseas military installations. Among other information TALON included lists of anti-war groups and people who had attended anti-war rallies. The database was criticized for gathering information on peace and other political activists who posed no credible threat, but who had been included in the database due to their political views. In August 2007, the US Department of Defense announced that Guardian, a database organized by the FBI, would take over data collection and reporting which was previously handled by the TALON database system.
- Homeless Management Information Systems: a class of database applications developed in the late 1990s that are used to confidentially aggregate data on homeless populations. Homeless Management Information Systems are typically web-based software applications used by assistance providers to record and store client-level information on the characteristics and service needs of homeless persons, coordinate care, manage operations, and better serve their clients.
- Case Management / Electronic Case Files: the distributed case management and electronic court filing system used by most United States Federal Courts. PACER, an acronym for Public Access to Court Electronic Records, is an interface to the same system for public use.
- Terrorist Screening Database – FBI's central terrorist watchlist
- No Fly List – US federal government list of individuals banned from US commercial flights
- Main Core – Alleged American government database
- Electronic Data Gathering, Analysis, and Retrieval – Securities and Exchange Commission database
- Automated Trusted Information Exchange

== See also ==
- Biometrics
- Identity document
- List of government surveillance projects
- Mass surveillance
- National DNA database
- Surveillance
