= National databases of United States persons =

Databases of Americans

Various national databases of United States persons, and their activities, have been compiled by government and private entities. Different data types are collected by different entities for different purposes, nominal or otherwise. These databases are some of the largest of their kind, and even the largest ever. Accessibility of government databases may be controlled by various means, such as requirement of a warrant, subpoena, or simple request from another branch of government. Commercial databases are generally established for profit. Some other databases are available for free usage with various states across the United States. Typical instances include Colorado Resident Directory and many others out there on the internet. Data breaches may occur as a result of a vulnerability or publication in error.

== Databases ==
=== Government ===
Data types	Program	Collector	Nominal purpose	Contains	Accessibility	Known breaches
Contact and educational information	Joint Advertising Marketing Research & Studies (JAMRS)	Department of Defense	Military recruitment	Public school students 17 and older		
Telephone call metadata	MAINWAY	National Security Agency	Military national defense	1.9 trillion call-detail records (estimated)	Assessed internally as "51% confidence" of being foreign	
Consumer transactions		Consumer Financial Protection Bureau		at least 10 million consumers	data at least partially anonymized	
Usual residency	Census	Census	assignment of federal representation	all persons	Confidentiality protected	
Identity, citizenship, residency, income, employment, medical, incarceration, and contact information	Federal Data Services Hub	Internal Revenue Service and Health and Human Services	administration of the Patient Protection and Affordable Care Act	all persons		
Exteriors of mail	Mail Isolation Control and Tracking (MICT)	United States Postal Service	criminal surveillance	all mail	Request by law enforcement	
Fingerprints	Integrated Automated Fingerprint Identification System (IAFIS)	Federal Bureau of Investigation	criminal and civilian monitoring	104 million persons (including 34 million non-criminals)		
Finger and palm prints, iris, and facial data (under development to replace the Integrated Automated Fingerprint Identification System)	Next Generation Identification (NGI)	Federal Bureau of Investigation	criminal and civilian monitoring			
DNA	Combined DNA Index System (CODIS)	Federal Bureau of Investigation	criminal investigation	10 million persons		
Income and employment	Internal Revenue Service (IRS)	Internal Revenue Service	Tax collection	Federal taxpayers		10,000's of 527 organization data
Citizenship and voter registration	Systematic Alien Verification for Entitlements system expansion (national citizenship database)	Department of Government Efficiency, Department of Homeland Security, and Department of Justice	alleged voter fraud identification			

=== Private ===
Data types	Program or Subsidiary	Collector	Nominal purpose	Contains	Accessibility	Known breaches
Employment and salary records	The Work Number	Equifax	debt collection and consumer profiling	190 million records covering more than one-third of U.S. adults	For sale	
Vehicle location data	Vigilant Solutions	Digital Recognition Network	consumer profiling	containing at least 700 million scans	For sale	
Vehicle location data		MVTrac	repossession	"large majority" of registered vehicles	For sale	
Vehicle location data		National Vehicle Location Service		over 800 million records		
Firearm ownership		National Rifle Association of America	Political campaigning	"tens of millions of people" (estimated)		
Stolen personal data		SSNDOB	Larceny	4 million persons	For sale	March 2013

== See also ==
- Government database
- Mass surveillance
