= Whistleblowers in the second Trump administration =

During the second presidency of Donald Trump, multiple individuals have taken advantage of government protection programs and organizations such as Whistleblower Aid and the Government Accountability Project to blow the whistle on illegal or improper actions.

== Allegations against DOGE ==
=== Warning about cuts to US foreign aid ===
Responding to DOGE's drastic 2025 cuts of the US Agency for International Development, the agency's acting assistant administrator, Nicholas Enrich, sent a detailed memo to staff describing the government’s "failure" to provide lifesaving assistance around the world. The memo said that cuts to U.S. Foreign Aid would cause "preventable death, destabilization, and threats to national security on a massive scale." His memo contradicted claims by Secretary of State Marco Rubio stating that a system exists to make exemptions for lifesaving assistance. Enrich was fired the same day the memo was sent. Later, Enrich testified to the Senate Foreign Relations Committee and wrote a book about his experience, entitled Into the Woodchipper: A Whistleblower's Account of How the Trump Administration Shredded USAID.

=== Alleged DOGE plan to classify 2.7 million living people as dead ===
According to a former senior Social Security executive, the Trump administration had plans to falsely declare 2.7 million people dead, in order to aid mass deportation efforts. In a 49-page whistleblower report, the executive, Jeremiah Schofield says that a DOGE official described the move as a ploy to make immigrants so miserable that they self-deported or went to Social Security offices for help, where they could be arrested. According to the report, several people at the Social Security Administration also shared the concern that the plan to add people to the Death Master File was intended to create financial pressure for immigrants to self-deport. Schofield said he refused to go along with the plan after lawyers warned it could be illegal and the plan was not carried out.

=== Allegations of DOGE copying and sharing Social Security Data ===
In a written whistleblower report, Charles Borges, the chief data officer at the Social Security Administration, alleges that, while working as part of DOGE, senior Trump appointees including Edward "Big Balls" Coristine copied Social Security numbers, names, and birthdays of over 300 million Americans to a private cloud server. Borges wrote that copying the database, known as Numident, constituted "violations of laws, rules, and regulations, abuse of authority, gross mismanagement and creation of a substantial and specific threat to public health and safety."

The complaint argues that cybersecurity officials within the SSA informed longtime Elon Musk ally and SSA Chief Information Officer Aram Moghaddassi of the "high risk" and potential "catastrophic impact' of the move, but Moghaddassi dismissed those complaints in an internal memo. Days after filing the report, Borges wrote that he faced retaliation at the agency and that he was resigning involuntarily.

In a related lawsuit in January 2026, the Justice Department said in a court filing that the SSA discovered a secret agreement between two DOGE employees and an unnamed political advocacy group, which discussed sharing Social Security data for the purpose of overturning election results. The filing makes clear that they had not yet discovered evidence that SSA data was shared with the group. The court filing admitted that DOGE members did share data with each other through Cloudflare, a private third-party server, and that the agency had not been able to determine what data was transmitted or what still exists on the server because at least some of the data is encrypted password-protected.

Also in January of 2026, a second whistleblower filed a report with the SSA's Inspector General alleging that a DOGE software engineer told several co-workers he had two sensitive databases, Numident and the Death Master File, in his possession and had at least one of those on a thumb drive. The engineer, who was starting a new job at a private contractor, allegedly asked the whistleblower for help transferring data from his thumb drive "to his personal computer so that he could ‘sanitize’ the data" before uploading it to the private company's systems. The engineer also told another employee, who refused to assist him on legal grounds, that if the transfer turned out to be illegal, he expected to receive a presidential pardon.

In March of 2026, Wired reported that several sources identified the DOGE engineer as John Solly. Solly was specifically named in the Borges report as a DOGE staffer who requested that the agency copy Numident data to the private cloud server. Solly denied the allegations.

== Tulsi Gabbard's alleged block of a Jared Kushner telephone intercept ==
In May 2025, a whistleblower drafted a classified report for Congress alleging that Director of National Intelligence Tulsi Gabbard learned of telephone intercept provided to the National Security Agency from a foreign intelligence service, and then blocked wider distribution of that intercept because it detailed two foreign nationals discussing their influence on a senior White House official. The NSA's report did not name the official, but people reading it, including the whistle-blower, were able to determine that it was Jared Kushner.

According to the whistleblower's attorney, a short time after the intelligence was collected, Gabbard took a paper copy of the intelligence directly to the president’s chief of staff, Susie Wiles. And the day following that meeting, Gabbard told the NSA not to publish the intelligence report. The complaint also alleges that NSA’s general counsel failed to report a potential crime to the Justice Department that was raised by the content of the intercepted conversation, and did so for political reasons.

The whistleblower's report itself bureaucratically stalled within Gabbard’s agency and was kept locked in a safe until it reached Congress in a heavily redacted form eight months later. The substance of the conversation was redacted but it in part concerned issues related to Iran.

Senior Trump administration officials have said the claims about Kushner are demonstrably false, but declined to offer more specifics. At the time the complaint was submitted, Deputy Inspector General of the Intelligence Community Tamara A. J. ohnson concluded that one of the complaint's allegations was not credible and that she could not assess the second.

Intelligence community Inspector General Christopher Fox, who shared the redacted complaint with Congress after The Wall Street Journal reported about its existence, said the complaint was "administratively closed" in June 2025 and no further investigative steps were taken.

== Allegations against Emil Bove ==
According to a whistleblower complaint from a DOJ lawyer, when he was working as a senior Justice department official, Emil Bove told subordinates he was willing to ignore court orders to fulfill the president’s mass deportation goals. The anonymous lawyer was revealed to be Erez Reuveni, who was fired by Todd Blanche after Reuveni conceded in court that the administration's deportation of Kilmar Abrego Garcia should have never taken place. Erez Reuveni later would claim in his complaint that was fired after he refused a direct order to file a brief falsely claiming that Abrego Garcia was a terrorist.

In June 2025, Reuveni filed a 27-page report with lawyers from the Government Accountability project stating he “became aware of the plans of D.O.J. leadership to resist court orders that would impede potentially illegal efforts to deport noncitizens, and further became aware of the details to execute those plans.” Ahead of Bove's confirmation hearing for a judgeship, Reuveni also released text messages to the Senate judiciary committee supporting his complaint. Democrats on the committee called for Reuveni to testify under oath, but their request was rebuffed.

On July 28 a second whistleblower came forward to confirm Reuveni's account of Bove's statements, saving Bove and DOJ officials were “actively and deliberately undermining the rule of law.” This whistleblower filed a claim with DOJ’s Office of Inspector General, and indicated they had information about further efforts to defy court orders.

On July 31, a third whistleblower came forward alleging Bove misled Senators in his confirmation hearings when he denied targeting prosecutors who disagreed with his decision to dismiss corruption charges on NY Mayor Eric Adams.

Just hours after the third whistleblower's report was public, the Senate confirmed Bove for a lifetime appointment as a federal appeals court judge by a 50-49 vote.

== Allegations against ICE ==
=== Alleged secret and unconstitutional practices by ICE ===
In January 2026, two US government whistleblowers alerted congress that, in 2025, the Department of Homeland Security authorized and trained Immigration and Customs Enforcement agents to forcibly enter homes without permission or a warrant issued by a judge. In the past, ICE instructed officers they could not rely on administrative immigration warrants — which are signed by agency officials, not judges — to enter people's homes. However, a May 2025 memo released by the whistleblowers, and signed by Acting ICE Director Todd Lyons, directs instructors to tell recruits the opposite. The memo reads, "the DHS Office of the General Counsel has recently determined that the U.S. Constitution, the Immigration and Nationality Act, and the immigration regulations do not prohibit relying on administrative warrants for this purpose."

The whistleblower complaint alleges the memo is given to some employees, who are directed to read it and return it to a supervisor. Agents are then verbally given this training, not in writing.

In February 2026, Ryan Schwank, an ICE lawyer and legal instructor, resigned his position and publicly came forward to confirm the memo and the whistleblower's allegations. Testifying to Congress, he stated, "ICE is teaching cadets to violate the Constitution, and they were attempting to cloak it in secrecy." Schwank also testified that ICE drastically reduced the training schedule for new recruits, and eliminated "240 hours of vital classes from a 584-hour program" including instruction on the Constitution, firearms and use-of-force training.

=== Alleged violations and misconduct in ICE recruitment ===
In the wake of a hiring surge in the summer of 2025, ICE lowered its standards, violating the law and allowing unqualified, “improperly vetted” candidates into the agency, according to an August 2025 whistleblower complaint submitted by a 17-year ICE veteran in charge of evaluating new recruits. The whistleblower alleges that agents were hired before passing fingerprint, identity, or credit checks and that political appointees were given access to national security information before passing background checks. The complaint specifically cites Corey Lewandowski, who was given an appointment despite a memo containing troubling but unsubstantiated allegations he had been paid years earlier for work by a Chinese government agency. “We chose as an agency to be more convenient rather than thorough,” the whistleblower told the New York Times. “By doing so, there was a potential to put lives at risk and to jeopardize national security.”

== Allegations of Kash Patel's personal use of FBI plane ==
In February 2026, Sen. Dick Durbin announced a whistleblower had contacted his office alleging that FBI director Kash Patel's personal use of an FBI plane had delayed and harmed investigations. According to the whistleblower, Patel's use of the plane in September 2025 caused the FBI's shooting reconstruction team to be delayed arriving in Utah to investigate the killing of Charlie Kirk. The whistleblower also alleges the same team was delayed in reaching the scene of a mass shooting at Brown University in December 2025, due to Patel's personal use of one FBI jet and his order to put the other on hold.

Durbin asked the Department of Justice’s Office of the Inspector General (DOJ OIG) investigate Director Patel for misuse or mismanagement of government resources, claiming the director "materially harm(ed) the mission of the very agency he has sworn to lead." Durbin added, "The FBI cannot afford to have its resources further stretched by a Director who views its staff and aircraft as a means to support his jet-setting lifestyle."

== Pretext for cutting federal grants to Brown, Columbia and Harvard ==
In the first weeks of the second Trump presidency, the administration announced the creation of a Joint Task Force to Combat Anti-Semitism and in the coming months announced plans to withhold federal funding from several universities for what the government claimed were civil rights violations.

According to a whistleblower complaint released in August 2026, Trump administration officials ignored the recommendations of their own investigators in a push to find civil rights violations by three Ivy League universities. Department of Justice civil rights lawyer, Haley Van Erem, and several collegues who chose to remain anonymous said that the task force was "politically mandated", and claimed the Trump administration used the issue of on-campus antisemitism as an unfounded pretext to cut federal grants to Brown, Columbia and Harvard universities. Their complaint called the effort a “predetermined, outcome‑driven approach to enforcement rather than a fact‑based investigative process."

Columbia University agreed to pay the government $200 million to restore access to federal grand funding, even though the whistleblower complaint alleges that the allegations against the university were "unsupported." In the case of Brown University, the complain alleges the government pursued a settlement "despite acknowledging the absence of a legal basis for doing so.” Brown settled their lawsuit for $50 million. In the case of Harvard, "extraordinary funding freezes and sweeping proposed settlement terms" were allegedly discussed even before an investigation had been completed. Harvard would later prevail in a lawsuit which ruled that the cancellation of federal funding was illegal. In her ruling, Judge Allison D. Burroughs wrote it was "difficult to conclude anything other than that defendants used antisemitism as a smokescreen for a targeted, ideologically-motivated assault on this country’s premier universities."

== Allegations of special treatment afforded to Ghislaine Maxwell in prison ==
In November 2025, a whistleblower at the Federal Prison Camp Bryan provided information to the House Judiciary Committee saying that, following Todd Blanche's interview with her and her subsequent transfer to FPC Bryan, Ghislaine Maxwell has been receiving special treatment not afforded to other prisoners. The whistleblower, later revealed to be a prison nurse, alleges Maxwell was offered private after-hours access to the exercise area, "customized" meals that are "personally delivered" to her, and meetings "personally arranged” by the prison ward for Maxwell's visitors in a "special cordoned-off area" outfitted with "an assortment of snacks and refreshments". Maxwell's visitors were also reportedly allowed to bring computers, which committee member Jaime Raskin described as unprecedented and a security risk. According to Raskin, one of the top officials at the facility has complained that he is "sick of having to be Maxwell’s bitch."

An Oct. 5 email appearing to be sent from Maxwell to her attorneys suggests that she plans to produce a “commutation application.”

The prison nurse who sent the information to the committee and others were fired for improperly accessing the prison email system, according to Maxwell's attorney.

== Allegations of Kennedy Center mismanagement ==
=== Accusations of waste of public funds ===
Several whistleblowers came forward to accuse the leadership of the Kennedy Center with "abuses of authority" and "gross waste of public funds." The whistleblowers allege that after the Trump administration installed a new board, the center, in consultation with the White House, rushed to perform renovations in time for Trump to receive the FIFA "peace prize" and host the Kennedy Center Honors at the venue. In order to make the rushed deadlines, management allegedly bypassed government contracting norms, and staff were reportedly told to "do whatever it takes" and they would "deal with the lawsuits later."

The whistleblowers allege that a South Carolina flooring company received an $8 million no-bid contract to replace the wood floor in the Concert Hall and other places despite the lack of evidence that it had ever before installed a concert hall floor. The allegations also include a rushed and cosmetic remake of the East Plaza Reflecting Pool, which they claim is already failing and will need to be rebuilt and a brand-new bathroom floor, which they say Trump tore out because he "didn’t like the color".

=== Accusations against acting director Richard Grenell ===
In April 2026, the Kennedy Center's former visual arts curator, Josef Palermo, wrote an account accusing Trump-appointed acting director Richard Grenell of mismanagement and re-focusing the Center's work towards cronyism and political access. One notable example was a fundraiser during a preview of Les Misérables, where theatergoers could pay $2 million for a box seat and a private reception with the president.

== 2026 election whistleblowers ==
=== Allegations that a proposed USPS portal could interfere with the 2026 election ===
A whistleblower report made public on August 31, 2026 alleges that new "untested" technology the United States Postal Service plans to implement as part of the Trump administration's push to restrict mail-in voting could "derail" the upcoming midterm election. Responding to an unprecedented and legally-disputed executive order directing the postal service to check ballots against a federally approved voter list before sending them, the USPS created the "Federal Ballot Mail Portal", an online site where state officials upload voter data, where arriving ballots would be scanned and cross-checked. According to the whistleblower, the portal operates with a "zero percent failure rate", meaning one faulty scan on a single ballot will reject an entire batch, which could prevent tens of thousands of ballots from being mailed. The whistleblower also alleges that the plan has been moving forward in defiance of several court orders blocking it.

Senator Richard Blumenthal, whose office received the report, called its allegations "mind-boggling" and urged Post Master General David P. Steiner to "abandon this ill-conceived, unconscionable plan and ensure that all Americans can exercise their constitutional right to vote."

Days later, the Postal Service Inspector General reported they received a copy of the whistleblower report and have opened an investigation.

=== Allegations against Homeland Security in election fraud search ===
On September 14, 2026, Democratic Senators released a whistleblower report focusing on what the Department of Homeland Security calls the "Unlawful Voter Initiative", an effort tasking hundreds of federal agents with scouring state voter rolls looking for evidence of noncitizen voter fraud. The whistleblower alleges the effort is relying on faulty data and is "knowingly sweeping known U.S. citizens in as potentially unlawful voters."

In addition, the report alleges investigators are accessing state websites using personal information to pose as individual voters and obtain voter records, which could have legal implications in some states, which limit the use of these tools to individuals. For instance, the Virginia website requires users to click a box certifying the information provided is the user's own and "I understand that it is unlawful to access the record of any other voter, punishable as computer fraud.” The report claims that DHS lawyers told investigators they would not be held responsible for state law violations when accessing this information.
