= AFIS =

AFIS may refer to:

- Advanced Fire Information System
- Aerodrome Flight Information Service
- Airborne Flight Information System, an avionics system proprietary to Honeywell Aerospace
- American Forces Information Service
- Association française d'Ingénierie Système, French chapter of the INCOSE
- Association française pour l'information scientifique, a French skeptical organisation
- Automated Fingerprint Identification System (disambiguation)
- Automatic Flight Information Service
- Amministrazione Fiduciaria Italiana della Somalia (Italian Administration of Somalia) United Nations Trust Territory

== See also ==
- Aphis (disambiguation)
