= Jean Canfield Building =

Canadian federal office building in Charlottetown, Prince Edward Island

Coordinates: 46.2370°N 63.1299°W

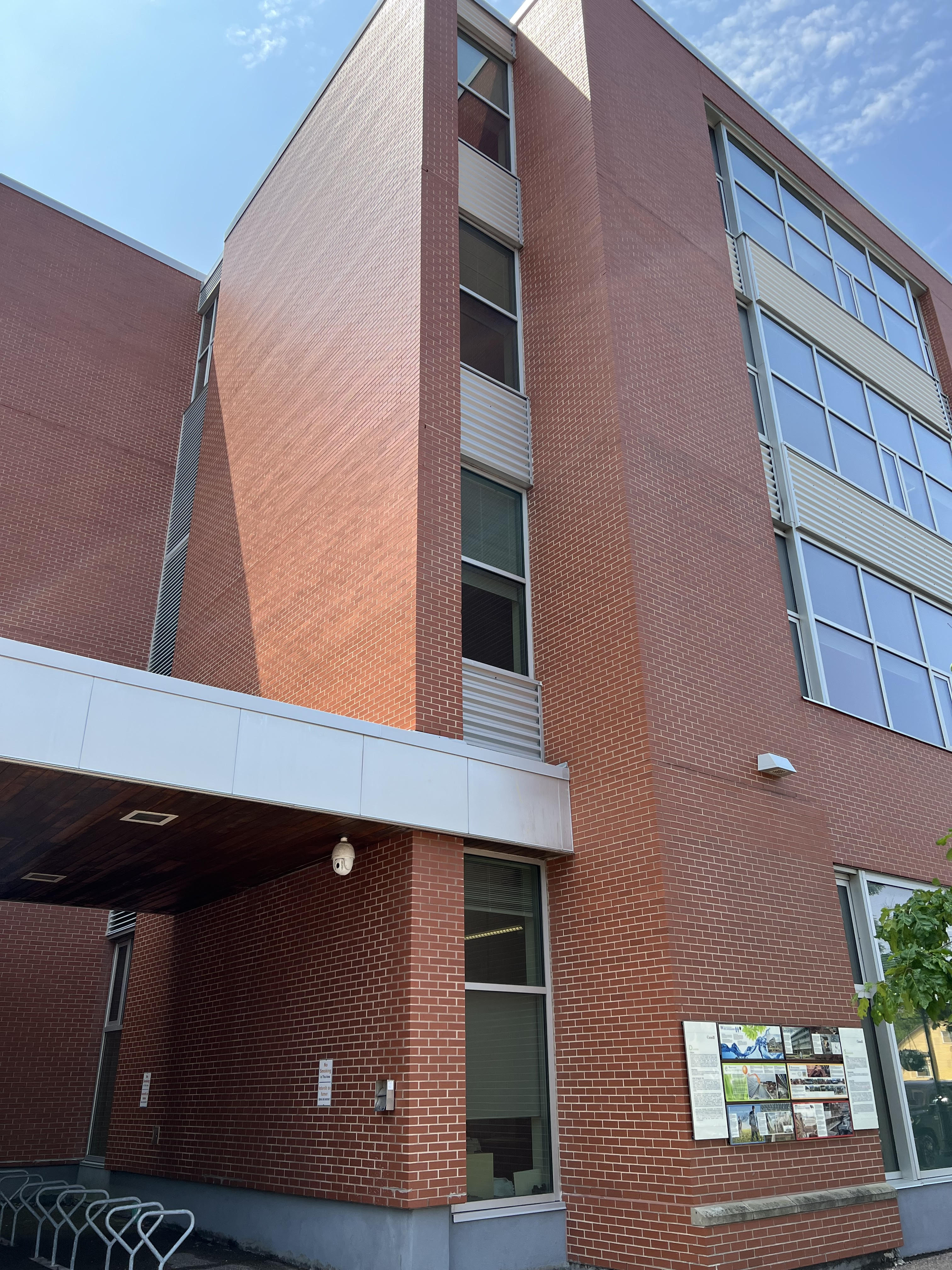
Photo of the Jean Canfield Building in Charlottetown

The Jean Canfield Building is a Government of Canada office building located in Charlottetown, Prince Edward Island. It is named after Jean Canfield, the first woman elected to the Legislative Assembly of Prince Edward Island.

The Jean Canfield building is one of the most environmentally friendly buildings ever constructed by Public Works and Government Services Canada.

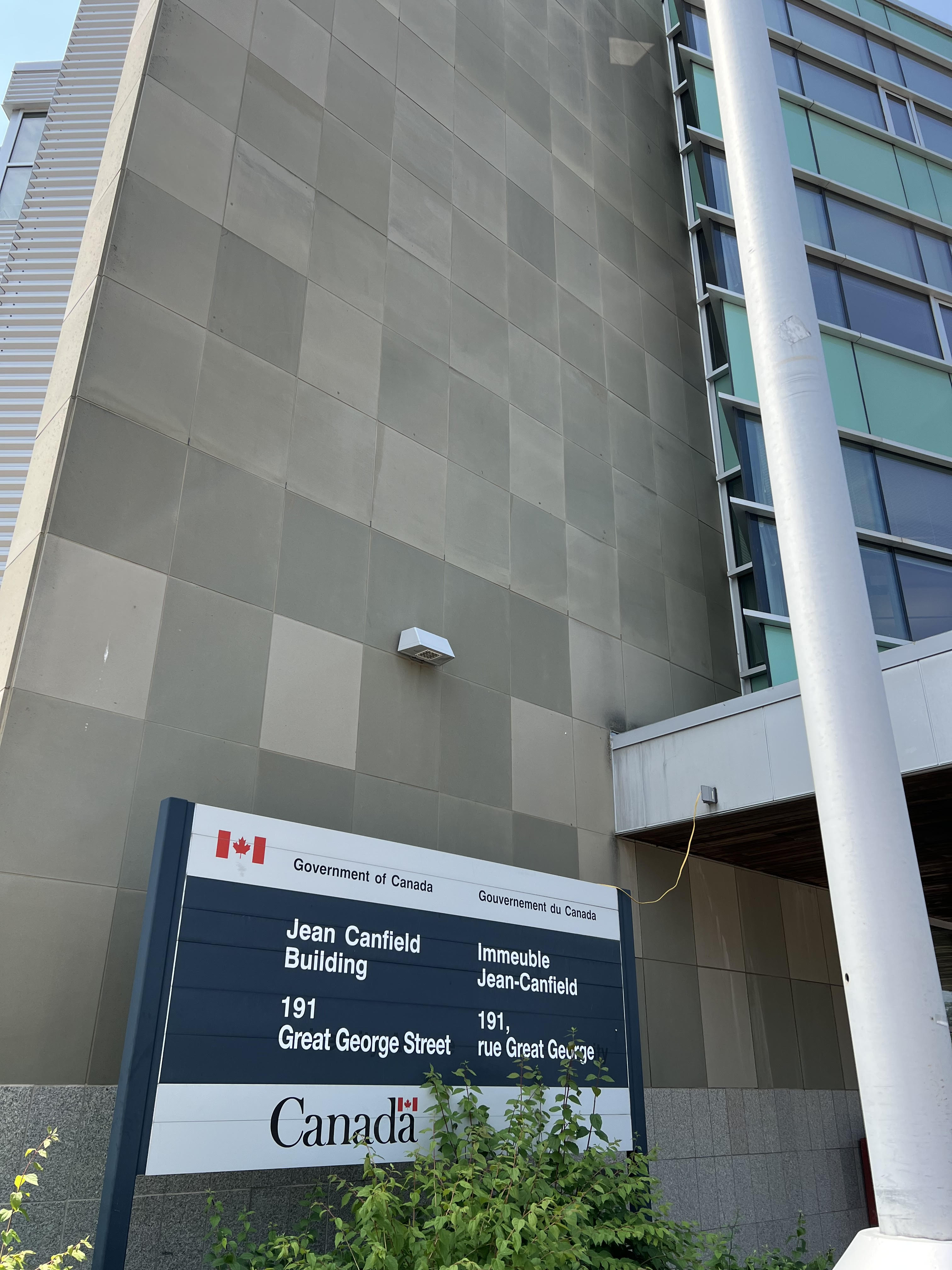

Constructed at a cost of $53.8 million in 2007, and officially opened in 2008, the structure is a modest 17,500 m^{2} rising 4 stories, and houses approximately 500 civil servants from 14 government departments. The building also houses the Charlottetown Service Canada Centre. The project was completed under the supervision of the Department of Public Works and Government Services and in October 2011 was awarded a Gold LEED certification, for its sustainable and green design. It has a 108 kW solar array on the roof, which in 2007 was the largest grid tied solar array in Canada.
