= Facial identification =

Facial identification may refer to:

- Face#Perception and recognition
- Face perception
- Wanted poster
- Facial composite
  - E-FIT - composite system
- Forensic facial reconstruction
- Facial recognition system
  - Next Generation Identification
  - Automatic identification and data capture

== Misidentification ==
- Cross-race effect
- Bell's palsy
