= Homeless Bill of Rights =

Legislation protecting the rights of the unhoused

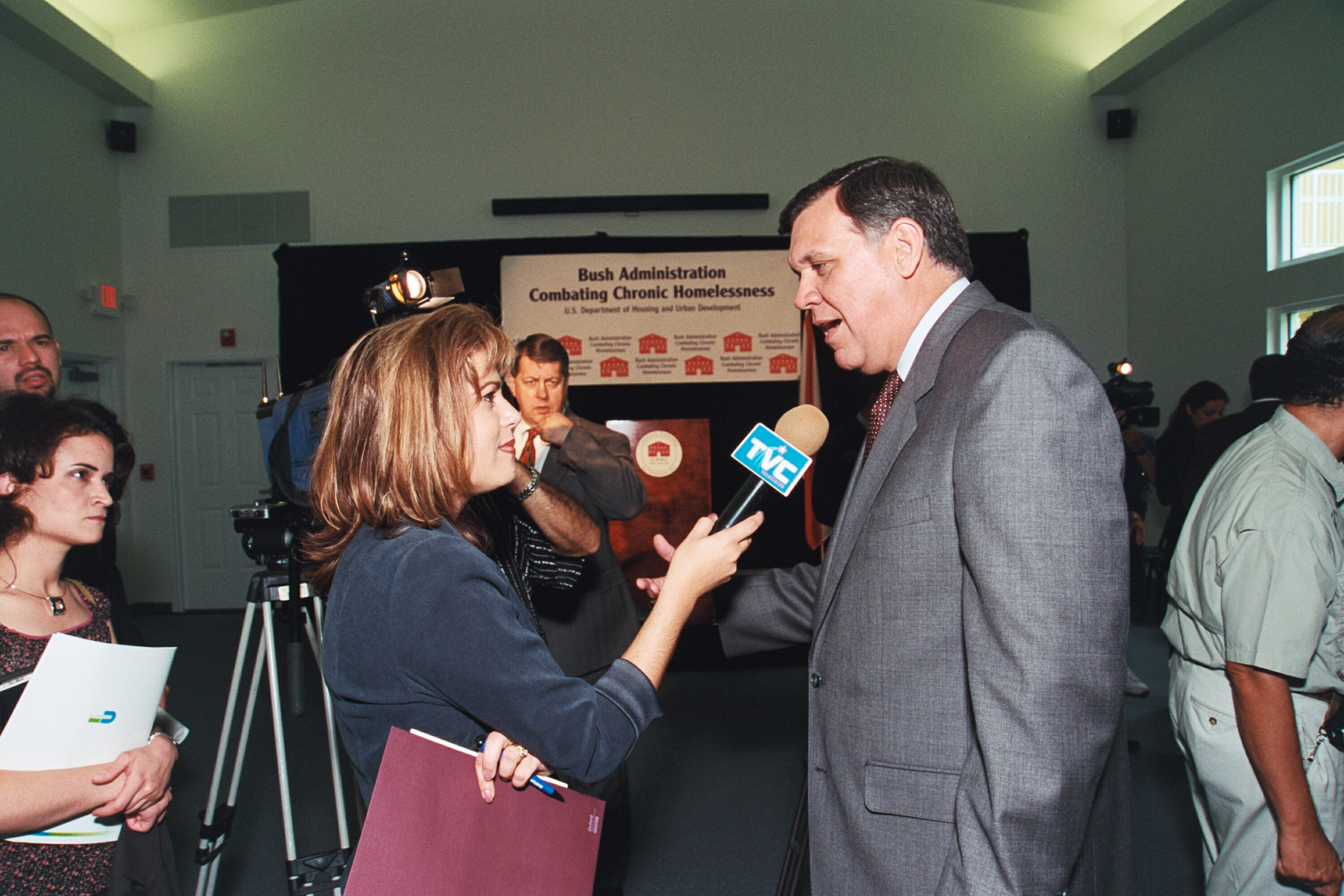
Secretary Mel Martínez speaking to the press at a "Combating Chronic Homelessness" town hall in Miami, 2002.

The Homeless Bill of Rights (also Homeless Person's Bill of Rights and Acts of Living bill) refers to legislation protecting the civil and human rights of homeless people. These laws affirm that homeless people have equal rights to medical care, free speech, free movement, voting, opportunities for employment, and privacy. Legislation of this type is currently being debated at the state level in the United States. Over 120 organizations in five different states have shown public support for a Homeless Bill of Rights and are working towards its implementation. A Homeless Bill of Rights has become law in Rhode Island, Connecticut and Illinois and is under consideration by several other U.S. states, including Alaska, California, Delaware, Minnesota, Missouri, Oregon, Tennessee, and Vermont.

== Overview ==
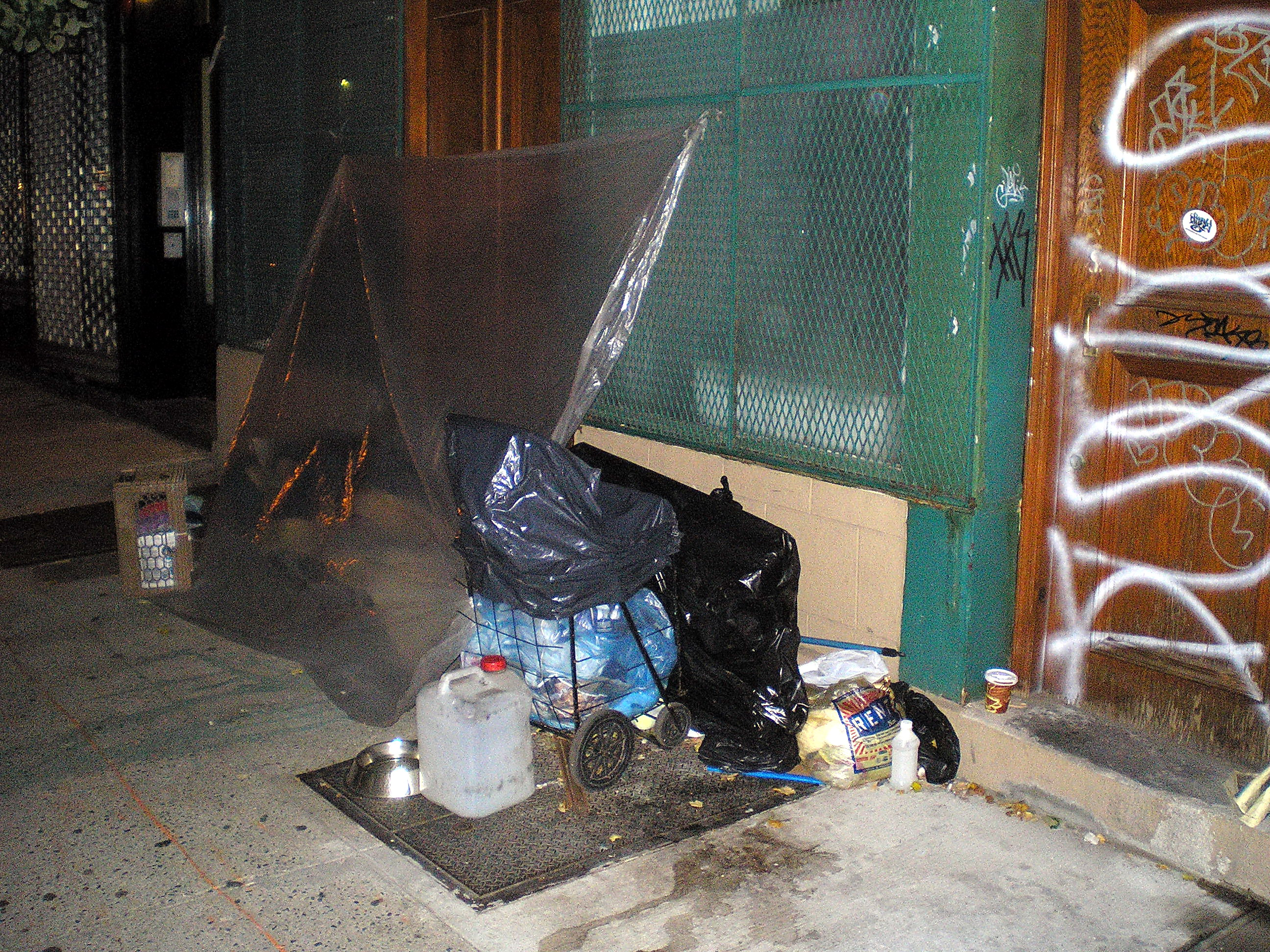
Homeless Bill of Rights laws affirm that people living on the street have a reasonable expectation of privacy in their property.

While the wording and objectives of proposed bills vary from state to state, most proposed legislation seeks to protect these central rights for all unhoused individuals:

- The right to use public spaces without fear of discrimination or harassment by law enforcement
- The right to vote on legislation
- The right to non-obstructively seek shelter, social services, legal aid, and education
- The right to privacy of property in public spaces
- The right to feel safe

This type of legislation is groundbreaking because it asserts that having a permanent and valid address is not a requisite for retaining basic rights. Many cities around the United States attempt to shift the problem of housing insecurity outside their jurisdiction by criminalizing homelessness. The criminalization of homelessness creates a vicious cycle of citations, fines, imprisonment, and reduced employability that further increases the difficulty of securing stable housing. States that implement a Homeless Bill of Rights protect individuals' rights to exist in public spaces, thus requiring that cities attempt to directly address the issue of housing insecurity. Moreover, while a Homeless Bill of Rights may not directly create significant change in the lives of unhoused individuals, it can facilitate a shift in the American perspective of homelessness and open up avenues for further discourse, programs, and legislation.

== Criminalization of homelessness ==
The criminalization of homelessness can be defined as the passage of laws or ordinances that prohibit sitting, sleeping, panhandling, sharing food, or religious practice in public spaces. Over half a million people are homeless on any given night in the United States, and a third of them are unsheltered. The growing issue of homelessness has been met with increasingly strict homeless legislation that seeks to reduce the visibility of unhoused individuals. These measures penalize individuals from performing necessary, life-sustaining practices (such as sleeping) outside of the private domain, and disproportionately impact unhoused populations who have no choice but to occupy public space for these activities.

Surveys by the Western Regional Advocacy Project (WRAP) have documented the impacts of such anti-homeless legislation by interviewing over 1,300 unhoused individuals. Of those interviewed, 81% of individuals reported being "harassed, cited or arrested for sleeping", 77% said they had been "harassed, cited or arrested for sitting or lying on the sidewalk", and 26% "knew of a safe place to sleep at night".

As The National Law Center on Homelessness and Poverty concludes its report on the "criminalization of homelessness":

Laws that criminalize visible homelessness are immoral and offend our basic human instincts. They are contrary to the fundamental religious and political principals from which the American people seek guidance, and their existence demonstrates that we have fallen vastly short of our religious and foundational aspirations.

Homeless Bills of Rights seek to amend local codes that outlaw loitering, vagrancy, sitting or lying on the sidewalk, begging, urinating, eating in public, and other behaviors that disproportionately affect homeless people. Most homeless advocates agree that the issue of homelessness can only be alleviated if there is a focus placed on changing laws that criminalize homelessness.

== Controversy over legislation affecting the homeless ==
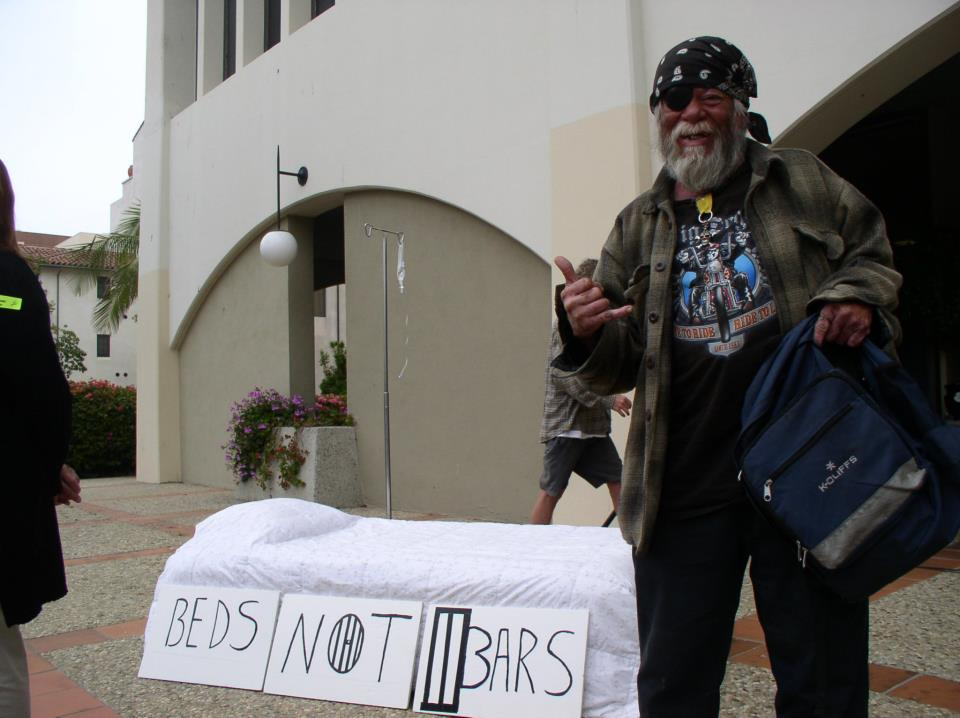
The "Beds Not Bars" slogan suggests that society must help homeless people instead of outlawing their behavior.

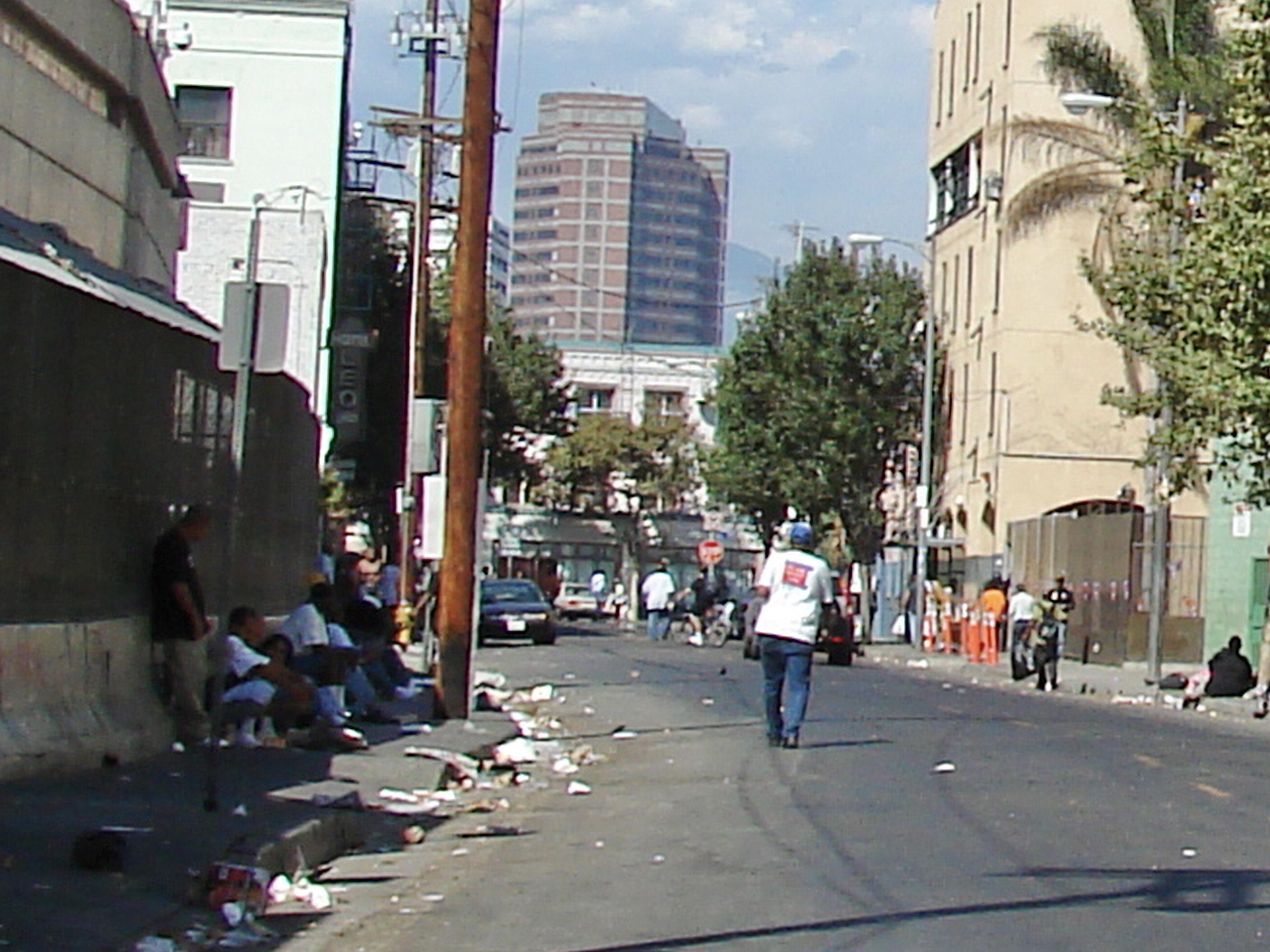
Skid Row in Los Angeles is sometimes mentioned as an area that would deteriorate if homelessness was not regulated

Opposition to legislature that supports the rights of unhoused individuals primarily comes from state and city officials, housed citizens, and varied business interests. Increasing the visibility of homelessness as a public issue is an implicit goal of many Homeless Bill of Rights advocates. Visible homelessness, especially in the form of encampments, is typically regarded as a failure of the city or state. Most anti-homeless legislation seeks to mitigate the issue by moving unhoused individuals from one space to another and thus decrease the visibility of "undesirable" individuals in public spaces.

Business interests, represented by the California Chamber of Commerce, have called Assemblymember Tom Ammiano's Homeless Person's Bill of Rights a "job killer" which would create "costly and unreasonable mandates on employers." Some municipalities and local politicians also oppose the laws, which impose state authority to overturn local regulations. San Francisco Supervisor Scott Wiener commented:

Our local laws against forming encampments, passing out and blocking sidewalks, and otherwise monopolizing public spaces would be wiped off the books. Think we have a street behavior problem now? Just wait until this passes.

The Los Angeles Times suggested in an editorial that the Homeless Bill of Rights does not go far enough unless accompanied by economic resources allocated to provide housing. Joel John Roberts, CEO of People Assisting the Homeless, argued similarly that the Homeless Bill of Rights may be toothless and even enabling. Roberts writes:

There needs to be a balance between criminalizing homelessness with ordinances that persecute people who are forced to live on the street, and giving those same people the right to do whatever they want without any consequences. ... A more powerful Bill of Rights for people who are homeless, however, would consist of one simple right: the right to housing.

== Legislation in the United States ==
The idea of a "Homeless Bill of Rights" has been discussed periodically in the US, and was presented formally by a group of New York City ministers on Martin Luther King Jr. Day, 1992. City Councilperson Peter Vallone introduced several versions of such a Bill in 1998, despite strong opposition from Mayor Rudy Giuliani.

Puerto Rico and some states have passed laws adding homeless people to their lists of groups protected against hate crimes.

=== Rhode Island ===
Rhode Island was the first state in the U.S. to pass a "Homeless Bill of Rights". John Joyce, who was homeless for a period in his life, is responsible for the initial introduction of the bill. The Rhode Island law, S-2052, was ratified in the state of Rhode Island on June 21, 2012, and signed into law by Governor Lincoln Chafee on June 27. It amends the Rhode Island Fair Housing Act with wording intended to protect the rights of homeless people and prevent discrimination against them. It is the first U.S. state-level law designed to protect the rights of homeless people.

Excerpt from Rhode Island bill S-2052
- 34-37.1-3. Bill of Rights. – No person's rights, privileges, or access to public services may be denied or abridged solely because he or she is homeless. Such a person 1 shall be granted the same rights and privileges as any other resident of this state. A person experiencing homelessness:
1. Has the right to use and move freely in public spaces, including, but not limited to, public sidewalks, public parks, public transportation and public buildings, in the same manner as any other person, and without discrimination on the basis of his or her housing status;
2. Has the right to equal treatment by all state and municipal agencies, without discrimination on the basis of housing status;
3. Has the right not to face discrimination while seeking or maintaining employment due to his or her lack of permanent mailing address, or his or her mailing address being that of a shelter or social service provider;
4. Has the right to emergency medical care free from discrimination based on his or her housing status;
5. Has the right to vote, register to vote, and receive documentation necessary to prove identity for voting without discrimination due to his or her housing status;
6. Has the right to protection from disclosure of his or her records and information provided to homeless shelters and service providers to state, municipal and private entities without appropriate legal authority; and the right to confidentiality of personal records and information in accordance with all limitations on disclosure established by the Federal Homeless Management Information Systems, the Federal Health Insurance Portability and Accountability Act, and the Federal Violence Against Women Act; and
7. Has the right to a reasonable expectation of privacy in his or her personal property to the same extent as personal property in a permanent residence.

The well-established Rhode Island Coalition for the Homeless (and a newer subgroup called Rhode Island Homeless Advocacy Project) collaborated with the more radical Occupy Providence group to lobby successfully for the Bill.

The legislation passed in Rhode Island guaranteed unhoused individuals seven negative rights. However, while it expressly states that "[n]o person's rights, privileges, or access to public services may be denied or abridged solely because he or she is homeless", the law does not guarantee positive rights such as housing or food. Because the legislation simply restates the rights of all citizens of Rhode Island, some homeless advocates are concerned that it has not had enough impact. However, this Bill is still noteworthy because the rights it does guarantee are judicially enforceable, and because it was the first of its kind to be passed in the United States.

=== Illinois ===
Illinois is the second state to adopt a homeless bill of rights. The measure, SB 1210, was passed in May 2013 by the Illinois General Assembly and immediately went into effect after being signed by Governor Pat Quinn on August 22 of that year.

Excerpt from Illinois bill SB 1210
Section 10. Bill of Rights.

(a) No person's rights, privileges, or access to public services may be denied or abridged solely because he or she is homeless. Such a person shall be granted the same rights and privileges as any other citizen of this State. A person experiencing homelessness has the following rights:

1. the right to use and move freely in public spaces, including but not limited to public sidewalks, public parks, public transportation, and public buildings, in the same manner as any other person and without discrimination on the basis of his or her housing status;
2. the right to equal treatment by all State and municipal agencies, without discrimination on the basis of housing status;
3. the right not to face discrimination while seeking or maintaining employment due to his or her lack of permanent mailing address, or his or her mailing address being that of a shelter or social service provider;
4. the right to emergency medical care free from discrimination based on his or her housing status;
5. the right to vote, register to vote, and receive documentation necessary to prove identity for voting without discrimination due to his or her housing status;
6. the right to protection from disclosure of his or her records and information provided to homeless shelters and service providers to State, municipal, and private entities without appropriate legal authority; and the right to confidentiality of personal records and information in accordance with all limitations on disclosure established by the federal Homeless Management Information Systems, the federal Health Insurance Portability and Accountability Act, and the federal Violence Against Women Act; and
7. the right to a reasonable expectation of privacy in his or her personal property to the same extent as personal property in a permanent residence.

(b) As used in this Act, "housing status" has the same meaning as that contained in Section 1-103 of the Illinois Human Rights Act.

The Illinois implementation of the Homeless Bill of Rights was significant because it included the ability to maintain employment as a right that unhoused individuals could claim. Many people struggling with homelessness also face employment discrimination, which makes it more difficult for them to attain financial and housing security. The Illinois law is also noteworthy because it allows plaintiffs to recover monetary damages and attorney's fees should their rights be infringed upon, something that is not covered in the Connecticut legislation.

=== Connecticut ===
On June 5, the Connecticut Assembly passed a Homeless Bill of Rights (SB 896) with seven protections similar to those passed in Rhode Island. After it was signed by Governor Dan Malloy, the bill took effect on October 1, 2013.

Excerpt from Connecticut bill SB 896

(a) There is created a Homeless Person's Bill of Rights to guarantee that the rights, privacy and property of homeless persons are adequately safeguarded and protected under the laws of this state. The rights afforded homeless persons to ensure that their person, privacy and property are safeguarded and protected, as set forth in subsection (b) of this section, are available only insofar as they are implemented in accordance with other parts of the general statutes, state rules and regulations, federal law, the state Constitution and the United States Constitution. For purposes of this section, "homeless person" means any person who does not have a fixed or regular residence and who may live on the street or outdoors, or in a homeless shelter or another temporary residence.

(b) Each homeless person in this state has the right to:

1. Move freely in public spaces, including on public sidewalks, in public parks, on public transportation and in public buildings without harassment or intimidation from law enforcement officers in the same manner as other persons;
2. Have equal opportunities for employment;
3. Receive emergency medical care;
4. Register to vote and to vote;
5. Have personal information protected;
6. Have a reasonable expectation of privacy in his or her personal property; and
7. Receive equal treatment by state and municipal agencies.

(c) Each municipality shall conspicuously post in the usual location for municipal notices a notice entitled "HOMELESS PERSON'S BILL OF RIGHTS" that contains the text set forth in subsection (b) of this section.

Laws in cities throughout Connecticut prohibit a person without a bed from sleeping on a park bench, ban someone without a place to be during the day from standing in a public plaza, and restrict the ability of a person without access to food to ask for money to buy something to eat. The Homeless Bill of Rights proposed in this state does not address the right of unhoused individuals to panhandle in public spaces. However, it does widen its scope of impact by guaranteeing rights for both individuals who are currently experiencing homelessness and those on the cusp of it. By including hidden homeless and housing insecure individuals, this state's Bill of Rights more broadly guarantees the rights of the homeless population than the laws passed in Rhode Island and Illinois.

=== California ===
State Assembly member Tom Ammiano (D-San Francisco) introduced a Homeless Person's Bill of Rights to the California Assembly in December 2012. In May 2013, the Appropriations Committee postponed debate until January 2014. Assemblymember Ammiano said in a statement that his bill was suspended largely because of the costs of setting up new infrastructure and enforcing the new rules. A report by the Chair of the Assembly Appropriations Committee estimates that setting up hygiene centers across the state would cost $216 million, with ongoing operating costs of $81 million annually. The report also estimates that setting up facilities for annual law enforcement reports would cost $8.2 million, with ongoing operating costs of $4.1 million annually.

Excerpt from CA Right to Rest Act 2018
| (a) Discrimination based on housing status is prohibited; (b) Every person shall have the following rights in public space without being subject to criminal or civil penalties or harassment by law enforcement, public or private security personnel, or any agents of any public-private partnership established under any municipal or county law: 1. The right to rest in a non-obstructive manner; 2. The right to shelter oneself from the elements in a non-obstructive manner; 3. The right to eat, share, accept, or give food in any public space where food is not prohibited; 4. The right to occupy a motor vehicle or recreational vehicle, provided that the vehicle or recreational vehicle is legally parked on public property or parked on private property with the permission of the property owner; and, 5. The right to a reasonable expectation privacy in one's personal property. |

California's Homeless Bill of Rights(Right2Rest Act), SB 608, was introduced by Senator Carol Liu (D) in February 2015. The "Right to Rest Act," would, among other things, protect the rights of homeless people to move freely, rest, eat, perform religious observations in public space as well as protect their right to occupy a legally parked motor vehicle. Also refer to UC Berkeley's Policy Advocacy Clinic Presents: California's New Vagrancy Laws a New Report on the Growing Criminalization of Homeless People in California.

A vote was not rendered during the 2015 process in the Housing and Transportation Committee and was asked to come back for a vote in the next California legislation session with amendments in order to get the necessary votes and pass to the next house.

=== Colorado ===
The Colorado Right-to-Rest Act, known as HB-1284, was proposed to the State Legislature in 2015. Like the bill proposed in California, HB-1284 seeks to protect the rights of unhoused individuals to move without fear of harassment, sleep, eat and share food, engage in religious practices, and occupy a legally parked vehicle in public spaces. Like all the Homeless Bills of Rights proposed before it, this legislation does not guarantee the rights of unhoused individuals to obtain safe shelter. The bill is currently under consideration by the Colorado State Senate.

Excerpt from Colorado Bill HB-1284
(1) A person experiencing homelessness is permitted to use public space in the same manner as any other person experiencing homelessness is permitted to use public space in the same manner as any other person without discrimination based on housing status. Every person in the state shall have the following basic human and civil rights, which may be exercised without being subject to criminal or civil sanctions or harassment by law enforcement, public or private security personnel, or district agents:
1. The right to use and move freely in public spaces without discrimination or time limitations that discriminate based on housing status;
2. The right to rest in public spaces and protect oneself from the elements in a non-obstructive manner;
3. The right to eat, share, accept, or give food in any public space where food is not prohibited;
4. The right to occupy a motor vehicle, provided that the vehicle is legally parked on public property or parked on private property with the permission of the property owner; and
5. The right to a reasonable expectation of privacy on one's personal property in public spaces to the same extent as personal property in a private residence or other private place.

== See also ==
- Bill of rights
- Human rights in the United States
- Aggressive panhandling
