= Automated fingerprint identification =

Process of using a computer to identify fingerprints

Automated fingerprint identification is the process of using a computer to match fingerprints against a database of known and unknown prints in the fingerprint identification system. Automated fingerprint identification systems (AFIS) are primarily used by law enforcement agencies for criminal identification purposes, the most important of which is the identification of a person suspected of committing a crime or linking a suspect to other unsolved crimes.

Automated fingerprint verification is a closely related technique used in applications such as attendance and access control systems. On a technical level, verification systems verify a claimed identity (a user might claim to be John by presenting his PIN or ID card and verify his identity using his fingerprint), whereas identification systems determine identity based solely on fingerprints.

AFISs have been used in large-scale civil identifications, the chief purpose of which is to prevent multiple enrollments in an electoral, welfare, driver licensing, or similar system. Another benefit of a civil AFISs is to check the background of job applicants for sensitive posts and educational personnel who have close contact with children.

== Deployed systems ==
The United States Integrated Automated Fingerprint Identification System (IAFIS) holds the fingerprint sets collected in the United States, and is managed by the FBI. However, the IAFIS is being retired to make room for a more improved software called the Next Generation Identification (NGI) system. Many states also have their own AFISs. AFISs have capabilities such as latent searching, electronic image storage, and electronic exchange of fingerprints and responses.

Many other countries and entities — including Canada, the European Union, the United Kingdom, Bangladesh, India, Israel, Pakistan, Sri Lanka, Argentina, Turkey, Morocco, Italy, Chile, Peru, Venezuela, Australia, Denmark, the International Criminal Police Organization, and various states, provinces, and local administrative regions — have their own systems, which are used for a variety of purposes, including criminal identification, applicant background checks, receipt of benefits, and receipt of credentials (such as passports). In Australia, the system is called the National Automated Fingerprint Identification System.

European police agencies are now required by a European council act to open their AFISs to each other to improve the war on terror and the investigation of cross-border crime. The act followed the Prüm treaty, an initiative between the countries Belgium, Germany, Spain, France, Luxembourg, the Netherlands and Austria. While technically not being an AFIS itself, the Pruem treaty's decentral infrastructure allows AFIS queries on all European criminal AFISs within a reasonable time.

== Fingerprint-matching algorithms ==
Fingerprint-matching algorithms vary greatly in terms of Type I (false positive) and Type II (false negative) error rates. They also vary in terms of features such as image rotation invariance and independence from a reference point (usually, the "core", or center of the fingerprint pattern). The accuracy of the algorithm, print matching speed, robustness to poor image quality, and the characteristics noted above are critical elements of system performance.

Fingerprint matching has an enormous computational burden. Some larger AFIS vendors deploy custom hardware while others use software to attain matching speed and throughput. In general, it is desirable to have, at the least, a two-stage search. The first stage will generally make use of global fingerprint characteristics while the second stage is the minutia matcher.

In any case, the search systems return results with some numerical measure of the probability of a match (a "score"). In ten-print searching, using a "search threshold" parameter to increase accuracy, there should seldom be more than a single candidate unless there are multiple records from the same candidate in the database. Many systems use a broader search in order to reduce the number of missed identifications, and these searches can return from one to ten possible matches. Latent to tenprint searching will frequently return many (often fifty or more) candidates because of limited and poor quality input data. The confirmation of system-suggested candidates is usually performed by a technician in forensic systems. In recent years, though, "lights-out" or "auto-confirm" algorithms produce "identified" or "non-identified" responses without a human operator looking at the prints, provided the matching score is high enough. "Lights-out" or "auto-confirm" is often used in civil identification systems, and is increasingly used in criminal identification systems as well.

== Skepticism ==
For many years, the FBI have presented the claim that fingerprint identification is a fully accurate and dependable source for profiling and identification. The belief in this technique was based on the assumption that there are no two fingerprints that are the same and that every person has their own unique pattern. However, there is no scientific evidence or studies that have been done to support this claim. This can also be applied to other forms of forensic identification, such as bite mark analysis — also known as forensic dentistry, which can be seen in a case of Levon Brooks. In terms of fingerprint identification, FBI agents who are responsible for examining the prints to determine the points of similarity in order to tell if they have secured a match, varies from examiner to examiner and from laboratory to laboratory. The decision process, unfortunately, is entirely subjective to the individual running the tests and there is no way to ensure that the examiner will not be susceptible to observer bias.

In 2004, after the Madrid train bombings, there were partial fingerprints identified from the bags of the explosives that had been left at the station. After careful consideration, it was determined by the FBI that the fingerprints left on the bag had matched to an individual in Portland, Oregon named Brandon Mayfield. This case, however, went on to change the entire outlook of fingerprint identification within the FBI, as it was later determined that he had been wrongly arrested. Because of this, the FBI is no longer able to testify that fingerprint identification is a 100% accurate technique for profiling, and should therefore be considered very carefully by anyone who uses it.

== See also ==
- Aadhaar
- EURODAC, an EU-wide system for storing and matching fingerprints of asylum seekers
- Fingerprint recognition
- Fingerprint Verification Competition
- Pattern recognition
