= Automated Fingerprint Identification System =

Automated Fingerprint Identification System (AFIS) can refer to

- Automated fingerprint identification systems in general
- Integrated Automated Fingerprint Identification System is the national system used by police departments and United States federal agencies such as the CIA and the FBI
