= Public Services and Procurement Canada =

Government department

- Services publics et Approvisionnement Canada

Department overview
- Formed: 1996; 30 years ago
- Type: Department; Responsible for: Government operations - key provider of services for federal departments and agencies; Canada Lands Company Limited (non-agent crown corporation); Canada Post; Defence Construction Canada; Payment In Lieu of Taxes Dispute Advisory Panel; Procurement Ombudsman; Public Servants Disclosure Protection Tribunal Canada; Public Service Commission of Canada; Public Service Labour Relations and Employment Board
- Employees: 17,085 (March 2021)
- Minister responsible: Joël Lightbound, Minister of Government Transformation, Public Services and Procurement and Receiver General for Canada
- Deputy Minister responsible: Arianne Reza
- Website: canada.ca/public-services-procurement

Public Services and Procurement Canada (PSPC; French: Services publics et Approvisionnement Canada) (Note: Public Services and Procurement Canada (formerly Public Works and Government Services Canada) is the applied title under the Federal Identity Program; the legal title is Department of Public Works and Government Services (French: Ministère des Travaux publics et des Services gouvernementaux).) is the department of the Government of Canada with responsibility for the government's internal servicing and administration.

The department is responsible for the procurement for other government departments and serves as the central purchasing agent, real property manager, treasurer, accountant, pay and pension administrator, integrity adviser and linguistic authority. It is also the custodian of a large real estate portfolio and as well infrastructure such as bridges, dams and highways.

The department is responsible to Parliament through the minister of public services and procurement and receiver general for Canada – presently Joël Lightbound. Day-to-day operations and leadership of the department is overseen by the deputy minister, a senior civil servant.

It was recognized in 2018 as one of Canada's Best Diversity Employers.

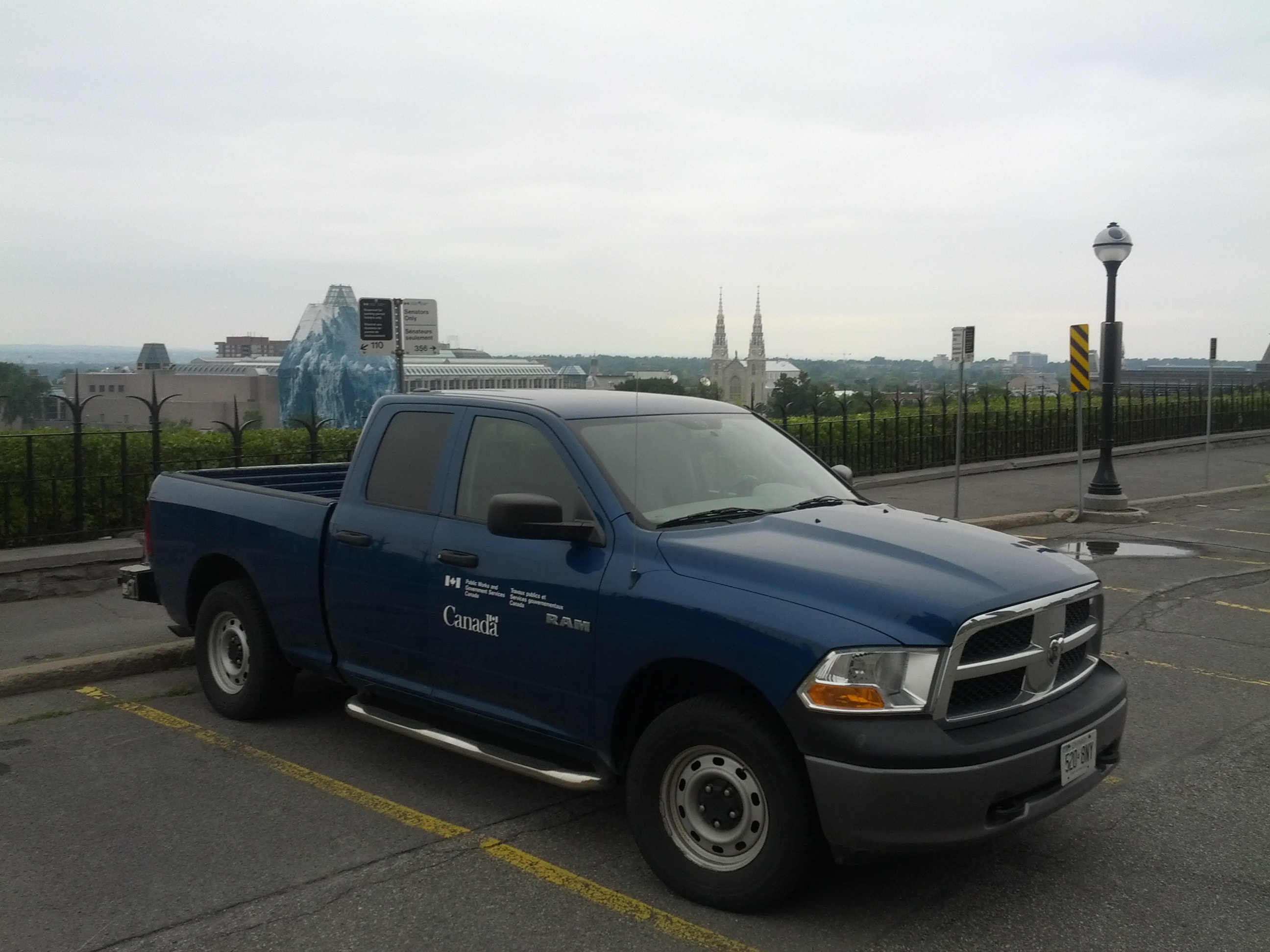
Vehicle of Public Services and Procurement in Ottawa

== Organization ==
=== Branches ===
- Defence and Marine Procurement
- Departmental Oversight
- Digital Services
- Finance
- Human Capital Management
- Human Resources
- Legal Services
- Office of the Chief Audit, Evaluation and Risk Executive
- Policy, Planning and Communications
- Procurement
- Real Property Services
- Receiver General and Pension
- Parliamentary Precinct

=== Regions ===
- Atlantic
- Quebec
- Ontario
- Western
- Pacific

=== Special operating agency ===
- Defence Investment Agency
- Translation Bureau

== Phoenix Pay System ==
The Phoenix Pay System is a payroll processing system for federal employees, run by PSPC. After coming online in early 2016, Phoenix has been mired in problems with underpayments, over-payments, and non-payments. As of March 2018, the estimated cost to fix the problems was over $1 billion.

== See also ==
- Government Electronic Directory Services
