= SAFARI =

French governmental project

SAFARI was an attempt by the French government, under the presidency of Georges Pompidou, to create a centralized database of personal data. SAFARI stands for Système Automatisé pour les Fichiers Administratifs et le Répertoire des Individus, "Automated System for Administrative Files and the Repertory of Individuals".

== History ==
The first mention of the project was made in a three-page article in the INSEE central review in March 1970. The French government began secretly working on the SAFARI project in 1973. The project aimed to identify French citizens with a unique number that would connect the information about them from various databases. In particular, it would use the INSEE code (also used as a Social Security number). The system was to be based on the Iris-80 computer.

On March 21, 1974, an article in the newspaper Le Monde by journalist Philippe Boucher revealed the existence of the project. The public outcry was immense, some critics comparing it to the national identity database created by the Vichy regime during Nazi occupation. The massive popular rejection of SAFARI prompted the minister of justice to create the Commission on Data Processing and Freedom, also known as the Tricot Commission after its leader Bernard Tricot. This led to the creation of the CNIL to ensure data privacy, as well as an accompanying 1978 law, the Data Protection and Liberties Act, restricting the storage and processing of personal data.

== See also ==
- Government databases
- French political scandals
