= National Center for Health Statistics =

American government agency

Agency overview
- Formed: 1960
- Jurisdiction: Federal government of the United States
- Headquarters: Hyattsville, Maryland, U.S.
- Employees: 700–750
- Agency executive: Carolyn M. Greene, M.D., Acting Director, National Center for Health Statistics
- Parent agency: United States Department of Health and Human Services
- Website: www.cdc.gov/nchs/

The National Center for Health Statistics (NCHS) is a U.S. government agency that provides statistical information to guide actions and policies to improve the public health of the American people. It is a unit of the Centers for Disease Control and Prevention (CDC) and a principal agency of the U.S. federal statistical system. It is headquartered at University Town Center in Hyattsville, Maryland, just outside Washington, D.C.

== History ==
The Marine Hospital Service, predecessor of the Public Health Service (PHS), began collecting data on communicable diseases and performing surveillance of the incidence and distribution of diseases due to an 1878 act of Congress. In 1893, another law provided for weekly collection of data from state and municipal authorities.

The Division of Sanitary Reports and Statistics was established in 1899 as part of the initial establishment of internal divisions within the Marine Hospital Service. Separately, the Division of Public Health Methods was formed in 1937 within the National Institute of Health. In 1943, these two divisions were merged, retaining the name Division of Public Health Methods but being transferred into the Office of the Surgeon General.

In 1946, the Division of Public Health Methods absorbed the Vital Statistics Division, which dated from 1903, from the Bureau of the Census in the Department of Commerce. The merged division was renamed the National Office of Vital Statistics. It was then transferred into the PHS Bureau of State Services in 1949.

In 1960, the National Office of Vital Statistics and the National Health Survey merged to form the National Center for Health Statistics. The National Health Survey had been created within PHS in 1956 through the National Health Survey Act (Pub. L. 84–652); it was the successor to a seminal national health survey performed by the Works Progress Administration during 1935–1936, which had multiple supplemental studies carried out in the intervening decades.

During the PHS reorganizations of 1966–1973, the National Center for Health Statistics was part of the Health Services and Mental Health Administration (HSMHA), and afterwards was part of the Health Resources Administration. Since 1987, it has been part of the Centers for Disease Control and Prevention (CDC).

== Data collection programs ==
NCHS collects data with surveys, from other agencies and U.S. states, from administrative sources, and from partnerships with private health partners. NCHS collects data from birth and death records, medical records, interview surveys, and through direct physical examinations and laboratory testing. These diverse sources give perspectives to help understand the U.S. population's health, health outcomes, and influences on health.

There are four major data collection programs at NCHS:

=== National Vital Statistics System ===
The National Vital Statistics System (NVSS) collects official vital statistics data based on the collection and registration of birth and death events at the state and local levels. NCHS works in partnership with the vital registration systems in each jurisdiction to produce critical information on such topics as teenage births and birth rates, prenatal care and birth weight, risk factors for adverse pregnancy outcomes, infant mortality rates, leading causes of death, and life expectancy.

=== National Health Interview Survey ===
The National Health Interview Survey (NHIS) provides information on the health status of the U.S. civilian noninstitutionalized population through confidential interviews conducted in households by Census Bureau interviewers. NHIS is the Nation's largest in-person household health survey, providing data on health status, access to and use of health services, health insurance coverage, immunizations, risk factors, and health-related behaviors.

=== National Health and Nutrition Examination Survey ===
The National Health and Nutrition Examination Survey (NHANES) is NCHS's most in-depth and logistically complex survey, operating out of mobile examination centers that travel to randomly selected sites throughout the U.S. to assess the health and nutritional status of Americans. This survey combines personal interviews with standardized physical examinations, diagnostic procedures, and laboratory tests to obtain information about diagnosed and undiagnosed conditions; growth and development, including overweight and obesity; diet and nutrition; risk factors; and environmental exposures.

=== National Health Care Surveys ===
The National Health Care Surveys provide information about the organizations and providers that supply health care, the services they render, and the patients they serve. Provider sites surveyed include physician offices, community health centers, ambulatory surgery centers, hospital outpatient and emergency departments, inpatient hospital units, residential care facilities, nursing homes, home health care agencies, and hospice organizations. The National Health Care Surveys are used to study resource use, including staffing; quality of care, including patient safety; clinical management of specific conditions; disparities in the use and quality of care; and diffusion of health care technologies, including drugs, surgical procedures, and information technologies.

== Other data collection programs ==
In addition to its major data collection programs, NCHS conducts targeted surveys and augments survey data where possible. NCHS conducts the National Survey of Family Growth to obtain information on factors affecting birth and pregnancy rates, adoptions, and maternal and infant health, and supplements the information obtained on birth certificates collected through the National Vital Statistics System. NCHS's State and Local Area Integrated Telephone Survey (SLAITS) produces state-level data on such topics as the health of children with special needs, to meet the data needs of its colleagues in HHS's Maternal and Child Health Bureau and elsewhere. NCHS's National Immunization Survey is conducted in collaboration with other CDC offices in Atlanta. NCHS's National Death Index creates a longitudinal component to other routine data systems. NCHS's Questionnaire Design Research Laboratory develops and tests survey and data collection instruments for use by NCHS and other federal agencies and research organizations.

== Leadership ==
Directors of the NCHS are senior executive appointees at the Centers for Disease Control and Prevention. The NCHS Director reports to the assistant director of the Office of Public Health Data, Surveillance, and Technology, who reports to the CDC director. The founding director of NCHS is Forrest E. Linder, who took the office between 1960 and 1967.

No.	Portrait	Director	Term start	Term end	Refs.
1		Forrest E. Linder	1960	1967	
2		Theodore D. Woolsey	1967	1973	
3		Dorothy P. Rice	1976	1982	
4		Manning Feinleib	1983	1995	
5		Edward J. Sondik	1996	2013	
6		Charles Rothwell	2014	2020	
7		Brian C. Moyer	2020	2025	

== See also ==
- National Institutes of Health
