= National Death Index =

US public health statical source

The National Death Index (NDI) is a United States resource available to researchers from the US National Center for Health Statistics to obtain death status (regular NDI) or cause of death (NDI Plus) for deaths of citizens occurring within the US.

The fees for routine NDI searches consist of a $350.00 service charge plus $0.15 per user record for each year of death searched. For example, 1,000 records searched against 10 years would cost $350 + ($0.15 x 1,000 x 10) or $1,850. Fees for the NDI Plus service are slightly higher ($0.21) per record.

NDI is similar to the Social Security Administration's Death Master File in terms of providing death status and date of death. However, NDI Plus service offers further information on cause of death.

The index was initially approved during Dorothy P. Rice's tenure as director.

In 2011, the National Death Index was linked to the General Social Survey, allowing for the analysis of societal attitudes and demographics, and their relationship to death.
