= Dorothy P. Rice =

American health statistician

- Born: June 11, 1922; Brooklyn, New York
- Died: February 25, 2017 (aged 94)
- Education: Brooklyn College
- Alma mater: University of Wisconsin–Madison
- Known for: Numerous cost-of-illness studies
- Awards: Association for Health Services Presidential Award for Leadership and Contribution to Health Services Research, American Public Health Association Sedgwick Memorial Medal, William B. Graham Prize for Health Services Research
- Scientific career
- Fields: Health statistics
- Institutions: National Center for Health Statistics

Dorothy Pechman Rice (June 11, 1922 – February 25, 2017) was an American health statistician whose work contributed to the creation of Medicare in the United States. Rice graduated from the University of Wisconsin–Madison and began working with the US government soon after, but left the workforce to begin raising a child. Just over a decade later, she returned to government work with a position at the Social Security Administration, where she was one of the first scientists to study the economic cost of illness and exposed a lack of health insurance among the elderly.

Rice was later the director of the National Center for Health Statistics from 1976 to 1982, where she helped create the National Death Index. She finished her career at the University of California, San Francisco, where she was a Regents' lecturer and professor emeritus. During her time at the university, she co-authored a paper on the costs of smoking, which impacted ongoing legal negotiations between the US government and the US tobacco industry and contributed to the Tobacco Master Settlement Agreement.

== Early life ==
Rice was born Dorothy Pechman in the Brooklyn borough of New York City on June 11, 1922. Her father, Gershon, was a textile laborer, and her mother, the former Lena Schiff, was a homemaker. Both were immigrants from Poland. Raised in Brooklyn, she attended Brooklyn College for a year and a half. She took up an offer from her brother to finish her collegiate work in Wisconsin at the University of Wisconsin–Madison, something she credited with changing her life, after he received a $2,000 fellowship that could support the both of them. While there, she majored in labor economics.

== Career ==
After graduating, Rice did not attend graduate school. Instead, she was determined to work for the federal government in Washington, D.C. Rice obtained employment at the Railroad Retirement Board and quickly moved up to the Department of Labor, as an assistant statistical clerk, and the War Production Board. Rice married Jim Rice in 1943 and left her job to be with him in Camp Grant, Illinois. Needing a job, she started assembling parts at a combined plumbing and munitions factory. It took a friend's word to get her husband transferred to Washington D.C., where he worked at Walter Reed General Hospital; she applied for and got a position with the War Labor Board.

After the Second World War, Rice got a job in the Hill–Burton program, but left the workforce in 1949 when her first child was born. She returned in 1960 after having two more children, but quickly contacted Louis Reed, her former boss, to move to a different job in the Social Security Administration in the Office of Research and Statistics. She worked under Ida Merriam, serving as the deputy assistant commissioner for Research. Her first task was analyzing the 1962 survey of the aged, the first time such a survey had been conducted. Rice was the first to publish about it, in a landmark 1964 paper on the number of US senior citizens who had health insurance. Rice found that only 8.5 million, or less than half of the total population, had it. Moreover, those that did not were more likely to be women and have lower incomes:

... the same factors making for more extensive use of hospital facilities among some segments of the aged population are associated also with lack of insurance protection for meeting such costs. The 8 1/2 million persons aged 65 and over with no health insurance of any kind include disproportionate numbers of the very old—particularly women—those in poor health, and those no longer engaged in full-time employment. These groups, who in the main have the lowest incomes, also spend more days in the hospital during the year than other aged persons. Thus the greater need for medical care at a time when income tends to drop—a chronic problem for older persons generally—is most acute for those with the least resources.

Rice's conclusions were a motivating factor in the creation of Medicare in the United States. In subsequent years, she began tabulating the economic costs of health, illness, and aging. She was among the first to link them in research; her papers included "Economic Costs of Cardiovascular Diseases" and the "Estimating the Costs of Illness." Scientists would later credit her with kindling the entire field of research. She was also the first to estimate the economic value of homemakers, who were predominantly women.

Rice left the Social Security office in 1976 to become the Director of the National Center for Health Statistics. Her proudest achievement during her tenure was the creation of the National Death Index, but her office's performance was heavily affected by job cuts during the presidency of Ronald Reagan. In 1982, Rice became a Regents' lecturer at the University of California, San Francisco (UCSF), where she focused on the financial impact of smoking cigarettes. In 1998, Rice and several co-authors estimated that the United States as a whole paid out $72.7 billion in healthcare costs related to smoking in 1993, with Medicaid alone paying out $12.9 billion. These studies emerged at the same time as, and had an effect on, negotiations between the US government and tobacco companies that eventually resulted in a court settlement that cost the latter over $200 billion.

Rice remained at UCSF as a professor emeritus until her death in 2017 at the age of 94, from complications after a fall resulted in a broken hip. Over the course of her career, Rice authored over 200 research articles, books, book chapters, and monographs.

== Awards ==
Rice was elected to the Institute of Medicine. She became a Fellow of the American Statistical Association in 1977. She received the Association for Health Services Presidential Award for Leadership and Contribution to Health Services Research. She also received the American Public Health Association Sedgwick Memorial Medal. In 2013, Rice received the William B. Graham Prize for Health Services Research. The New York Times said of her career that she was "a pioneering government economist and statistician whose research about the need of the aged for health insurance helped make the case for the passage of Medicare in 1965."
