= Commission nationale de l'informatique et des libertés =

French administrative regulatory body

The Commission nationale de l'informatique et des libertés (CNIL, French pronunciation: [knil]; English: National Commission on Informatics and Liberty) is an independent French administrative regulatory body whose mission is to ensure that data privacy law is applied to the collection, storage, and use of personal data. It is the national data protection authority for France. Its existence was established by the French loi n° 78-17 on Information Technology, Data Files and Civil Liberty of 6 January 1978. From September 2011 to February 2019, the CNIL was chaired by Isabelle Falque-Pierrotin. Its chair is Marie-Laure Denis.

== History ==
The CNIL was created partially in response to public outrage against the SAFARI program, which was an attempt by the French government to create a centralized database allowing French citizens to be personally identified by different government services. On 21 March 1974, an article in the newspaper Le Monde, "SAFARI ou la chasse aux Français" (SAFARI; or, Hunting Frenchmen) brought public attention to the project. Interior Minister Jacques Chirac, freshly appointed following the events of May 1968, had to face the public uproar. Chirac was the successor to Raymond Marcellin, who had been forced to resign in the end of February 1974 after having attempted to place wiretaps in the offices of the weekly newspaper Le Canard enchaîné. The massive popular rejection of the government's activities in this domain prompted the creation of the CNIL.

At the beginning of 1980, when the CNIL began its main activities, news anchorman Patrick Poivre d'Arvor announced that the CNIL had registered 125,000 files. By the end of 1980, Poivre d'Arvor counted 250,000 files (public and private).

== Composition and independence ==
The CNIL is composed of seventeen members from various government entities, four of whom are members of the French parliament (Assemblée nationale and Sénat); twelve of these members are elected by their representative organisations in the CNIL.

The CNIL's status as an administrative regulatory body gives it total independence to choose its course of action. However, its power is limited and defined by law. The CNIL is financed by the budget of the French Republic.

Presidents of the CNIL	Began	Ended
Pierre Bellet	5 December 1978	27 November 1979
Jacques Thyraud	1979	1983
Jean Rosenwald	1983	June 1984
Jacques Fauvet	14 June 1984	1999
Michel Gentot	3 February 1999	7 January 2004
Alex Türk	3 February 2004	21 September 2011
Isabelle Falque-Pierrotin	21 September 2011	2 February 2019
Marie-Laure Denis	2 February 2019	

== Power ==
The CNIL registers the setup of information systems that process personal data on French territories. By September 2004, more than 800,000 declarations of such systems had been made. Additionally, CNIL checks the law to be applied in this domain as well as in about 50 annual "control missions". CNIL can warn organisations or people who are found to be non-compliant with the law, and also report them to the Parquet.

== Regulation ==
The main principles for regulation of personal data processing are as follows (non-exhaustive list):

- all illegal means of data collection are forbidden;
- the purpose of the data files must be explicitly stated;
- people registered in files must be informed of their rights, for example, for rectification and deletion of data on demand;
- finally, no decision about an individual can be decided by a computer.

The archival of sensitive information can result in a five-year prison term and a €300,000 fine.

== European and international contexts ==
Germany in 1971, Sweden in 1973, and France in 1978 were the first three states to vote for a "Computers and Liberty" law; these work with an independent control authority.

International, economic, and political structures have been created or assigned to apply CNIL directives. Amongst these are the Organisation for Economic Co-operation and Development (OECD) in 1980, the Council of Europe in 1981 and the United Nations (UN) in 1990. In 1995, the European Commission voted through a directive in this manner. As of 2004, 25 countries have applied this directive.

== Criticisms ==
The CNIL is the target of various criticisms, alleging its lack of action and tendency to support governmental legislation, forgetting its original aims of protecting data privacy and citizens' rights. It is regularly criticised for its lack of administering proper sanctions to data privacy violations. It was criticized, for instance, for having authorized "ethnic statistics", forbidden in official demographic statistics.

The CNIL has been criticized for attempting to enforce right to be forgotten rulings on search results globally. In 2016, Google appealed a CNIL right to be forgotten ruling on the grounds that it could set a precedent for abuse by "less open and democratic" governments.

== See also ==
- French national identity card
- General Data Protection Regulation
- Regulatory Authority for Audiovisual and Digital Communication
