= United States national citizenship database =

Proposed database

Since 2025, the Department of Government Efficiency (DOGE), the US Department of Homeland Security and US Department of Justice have attempted to create a national citizenship database that simultaneously functions as a national voter database in the United States, which does not currently possess such databases.

== Background ==
Prior to the second Trump administration, the US federal government has never attempted to create a centralized and comprehensive database of American citizens. Maintaining voter registration lists is the responsibility of state governments, as the Constitution reserves control of elections to the states.

== History ==
=== Executive Order 14248 ===
On March 25, 2025, president Donald Trump issued Executive Order 14248, titled Preserving and Protecting the Integrity of American Elections, which requires the attorney general to “ensure compliance” with voter registration laws and "take appropriate action with respect to states that fail to comply” with voter laws." The Department of Justice sought voter registration list data from 50 states and Washington, D.C. to "ensure that states have proper and effective voter registration and voter list maintenance programs." The department subsequently filed suit against Washington, D.C. and 30 states that did not comply with its requests.

In June 2025, DOGE and the Department of Homeland Security created a searchable national citizenship database, combining information from immigration agency and Social Security Administration databases, through expanding the Systematic Alien Verification for Entitlements (SAVE) system.

==== League of Women Voters v. Department of Homeland Security ====
In October 2025, the League of Women Voters, Electronic Privacy Information Center and five individuals filed suit against the Trump administration in League of Women Voters v. Department of Homeland Security, arguing the expansion of the Systematic Alien Verification for Entitlements system violated the Privacy Act of 1974 and the Constitution.

On June 22, 2026, a federal judge Sparkle L. Sooknanan found the expansion violated the Administrative Procedure Act, Social Security Act and Privacy Act of 1974, and ordered that DHS stop permitting states to search the data, which includes Social Security records. In her ruling, she wrote that "All in all, the federal government has knowingly trampled on the privacy rights of American citizens in a manner that threatens the sacred right to vote," adding, "This Court cannot stand idly by while that happens."

==== State of Florida v. Department of Homeland Security ====
On October 16, 2024 during the prior Biden Administration, the State of Florida sought access to the Systematic Alien Verification for Entitlements database from DHS and filed State of Florida v. Department of Homeland Security. Florida was joined by 3 other Republican-led states, Indiana, Iowa, and Ohio, in a settlement with DHS approved in a December 1, 2025 settlement by District Judge T. Kent Wetherell II in northern Florida.

In 2026, the states subsequently argued the DHS had violated the terms of the agreement, with judge Wetherell agreeing and ruling the DHS had to make the enhanced database available to the four states. This led to a conflicting ruling with Judge Sooknanan's prior ruling in June 2026.

=== Executive Order 14399 ===
On March 31, 2026, president Donald Trump issued Executive Order 14399, titled Ensuring Citizenship Verification and Integrity in Federal Elections, which directs US Citizenship and Immigration Services and the Social Security Administration to create "State Citizenship Lists" of individuals the agencies believe are citizens in each state, and send those lists to state officials "no fewer than 60 days before each regularly scheduled Federal election."

=== ICE vote database contract ===
In August 2026, Immigration and Customs Enforcement published a $5 million contract to create a national database of voters in an effort to combat alleged fraud.

== See also ==
- National databases of United States persons
