= Brian C. Moyer =

Director of the U.S. National Center for Health Statistics

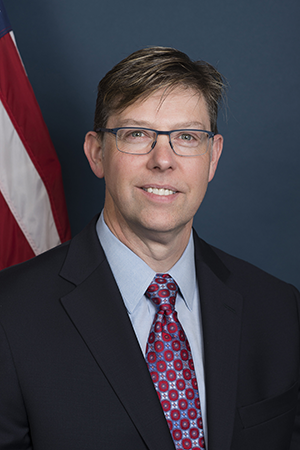

Director of the National Center for Health Statistics
- Incumbent
- Assumed office March 30, 2020
- President: Donald Trump
- Preceded by: Charles J. Rothwell

Personal details
- Education: University of Maryland; American University

Brian C. Moyer is an American economist who is the director of the U.S. National Center for Health Statistics. Moyer serves as senior advisor to the Centers for Disease Control and Prevention and to the secretary of the U.S. Department of Health and Human Services; he also serves as the statistical official for the department.

== Education ==
Moyer received a bachelor's and master's degrees in economics from the University of Maryland and a Ph.D. in economics in 2002 from American University.

== Career ==
Moyer spent more than 25 years with the U.S. Department of Commerce. He served as Director of the Bureau of Economic Analysis (BEA), where he led modernization efforts to improve official economic statistics, including the measures of gross domestic product (GDP).
