= Credit zombie =

Person who has been erroneously declared dead by the US Social Security Administration

In the United States, a credit zombie is a person who has been erroneously declared dead by the Social Security Administration by being listed in its Death Master File (commercially known as the Social Security Death Index). It is unclear why living people are added to this list. It has been claimed that people may have been added to this list due to their immigration status.

As a result of the listing, credit bureaus return reports of "deceased" to entities seeking checks on the individuals' credit reports, which can prevent people from obtaining credit, receiving government benefits, renting apartments, or securing jobs, and interfere with anything involving credit checks or Social Security. Credit zombies may even find their bank accounts frozen and have no access to their money.

The term "credit zombie" is an analogy to the concept of the zombie being a person who was once alive walking around as an animated corpse after death. A credit zombie is someone who is officially dead, while it is obvious that person is actually alive.

The Social Security Administration accidentally declares about 1,000 people dead each month in its Death Master File. It is estimated that there could be 500,000 credit zombies in the U.S.

== See also ==
- Phantom debt, debt that is old, defaulted, or not owed and is somehow still being pursued for collection to be paid by the presumed debtor
