= Aphis (disambiguation) =

Aphis may refer to:

- Aphis, a genus of aphid species
- Animal and Plant Health Inspection Service (APHIS), organizational unit of the USDA
- HMS Aphis (1915), Royal Navy insect class gunboat

== See also ==
- Aphid
- AFIS (disambiguation)
