= Social Security Death Index =

Database from the US Social Security Administration

The Social Security Death Index (SSDI) was a database of death records created from the United States Social Security Administration's Death Master File until 2014. Since 2014, public access to the updated Death Master File has been via the Limited Access Death Master File certification program instituted under Title 15 Part 1110. Most persons who have died since 1936 who had a Social Security Number (SSN) and whose death has been reported to the Social Security Administration are listed in the SSDI. For most years since 1973, the SSDI includes 93 percent to 96 percent of deaths of individuals aged 65 or older. It was frequently updated; the version of June 22, 2011 contained 89,835,920 records.

Unlike the Death Master File, the SSDI is available to the public at many online genealogy websites. The SSDI is a popular tool for genealogists and biographers because it contains valuable genealogical data.

== Data contained ==
Data in the Social Security Death Index include:

- Given name and surname; and since the 1990s, middle initial
- Date of birth
- Month and year of death; or full date of death for accounts active in 2000 or later
- Social Security number
- State or territory where the Social Security number was issued
- Last place of residence while the person was alive (ZIP code).

Once a deceased person is found in the database, the person's application for Social Security card (Form SS-5) can be ordered from the Social Security Administration. The SS-5 may contain additional genealogical data, such as birthplace, father's name, and mother's full maiden name or that information may be blacked out.

== Criticisms ==
A government audit revealed that the Social Security Administration had incorrectly listed 23,000 people as dead in a two-year period. These people sometimes faced difficulties in convincing government agencies that they were actually alive; a 2008 story in the Nashville area focused on a woman who was incorrectly flagged as dead in the Social Security computers in 2000 and had difficulties, such as having health insurance canceled and electronically filed tax returns rejected. This story also noted that such people could be highly vulnerable to identity theft because of the release of their Social Security numbers.

In November 2011, due to privacy and identity theft concerns, the Social Security Administration redacted and no longer included death data derived from State sources. This resulted in an approximately 33% drop in reported deaths.

On December 18, 2011, Ancestry.com, changed access to the SSDI by moving the SSDI search behind a paywall, and stopped displaying the Social Security information of people who had died within the past 10 years. Some of their originally free information is now available via paid subscription only. However, other sites still provide free access.

In March 2012, the entire Death Master File, edition of November 30, 2011, was made available for download. An updated version was made available May 31, 2013. Updates have also been available by a subscription service.

A review by the Government Accountability Office in 2013 found that the Social Security Administration and other federal benefit-paying agencies that use data from the Death Master File are potentially vulnerable to making improper payments due to errors or processes that could lead to errors.

== See also ==
- Credit zombie
