= Federal Data Services Hub =

The Federal Data Services Hub is a tool used to facilitate the government-backed Patient Protection and Affordable Care Act health coverage program.

== Origins ==
It is built by the Internal Revenue Service (IRS) and Health and Human Services (HHS). It combines data on income and employment from IRS records, health and entitlements from HHS records, identity from Social Security, citizenship from Department of Homeland Security records, criminality from Department of Justice records, and residency from state records. Also involved will be the Department of Defense, the Department of Veterans Affairs, the Office of Personnel Management, the Peace Corps, and state Medicaid administrations.

== Content ==
Data includes:

Categories of Records in the System

No information is maintained in this system for individual applicant/enrollees. The hub accesses and passes data which includes, but may not be limited to, the applicant's first name, last name, middle initial, mailing address or permanent residential address (if different from the mailing address), date of birth, Social Security Number (if the applicant has one), taxpayer status, gender, ethnicity, residency, email address, and telephone number.

The system also accesses information that will verify the information provided by the individual/enrollee or by the application filer on behalf of other applicants that will enable a decision about an applicant's eligibility. The system will collect and maintain information that the applicant or the application filer on behalf of other applicants submits pertaining to:

(1) his or her citizenship or immigration status, because only individuals who are citizens or nationals of the U.S. or lawfully present are eligible to enroll
(2) enrollment in Federally funded minimum essential health coverage (e.g. Medicare, Medicaid, Federal Employees Health Benefit Program (FEHBP), Veterans Health Administration (Champ VA), Children's Health Insurance Program (CHIP), Department of Defense (TRICARE), Peace Corps)
(3) incarceration status
(4) Indian status
(5) enrollment in employer-sponsored coverage
(6) requests for and accompanying documentation to justify receipt of individual responsibility exemptions, including membership in a certain type of recognized religious sect or health care sharing ministry
(7) employer information
(8) status as a veteran
(9) limited health status information (pregnancy status, blindness, disability status)
(10) household income, including tax return information from the IRS, income information from the Social Security Administration, and financial information from other third party sources. Information will also be maintained with respect to the applicant's enrollment in a QHP through the Exchange, the premium amounts and payment history.

With respect to qualified employers and the qualified employees utilizing SHOP, the information maintained in the system includes but may not be limited to the name and address of the employer, number of employees, Employer Identification Number (EIN), and list of qualified employees and their tax ID numbers.

— Federal Register Volume 78, Number 25
