= Advanced fire information system =

The advanced fire information system (AFIS) provides information on current and historical fires detected by sensors on Earth observation satellites, e.g. NASA MODIS, EUMETSAT MSG, GOES, NPP, etc. covering multiple regions across the globe. The system provides monitoring of active fire on a web-based map and delivers near real-time alerts to registered users when a fire is detected within their specified areas of interest via email, SMS, XMPP, etc.

The system started as a research project at the CSIR Meraka Institute in collaboration with Eskom in 2007. It was then extended to support many fire protection associations in South Africa.
