= Fingerprint Verification Competition =

International competition for fingerprint verification algorithms

The Fingerprint Verification Competition (FVC) is an international competition for fingerprint verification algorithms organized in 2000 by the Biometric System Laboratory (University of Bologna), the U.S. National Biometric Test Center (San Jose State University) and the Pattern Recognition and Image Processing Laboratory (Michigan State University). After the success of the first edition (FVC2000), three other editions were organized every two years (FVC2002, FVC2004 and FVC2006).

These events received great attention both from academic and industrial biometric communities. They established a common benchmark, allowing developers to unambiguously compare their algorithms, and provided an overview of the state-of-the-art in fingerprint recognition.

After the fourth edition, the interest shown in previous editions by the biometrics community has prompted the Biometric System Laboratory (University of Bologna) to organize a new online evaluation campaign not only limited to fingerprint verification algorithms: FVC-onGoing]. FVC-onGoing offers web-based automatic evaluation of biometric algorithms on a set of sequestered datasets, reporting results using well known performance indicators and metrics. While previous FVC initiatives were organized as “competitions”, with specific calls and fixed time frames, FVC-onGoing is:

- an “ongoing competition” always open to new participants;
- an evolving online repository of evaluation metrics and results.
