= SSNDOB =

Criminal marketplace

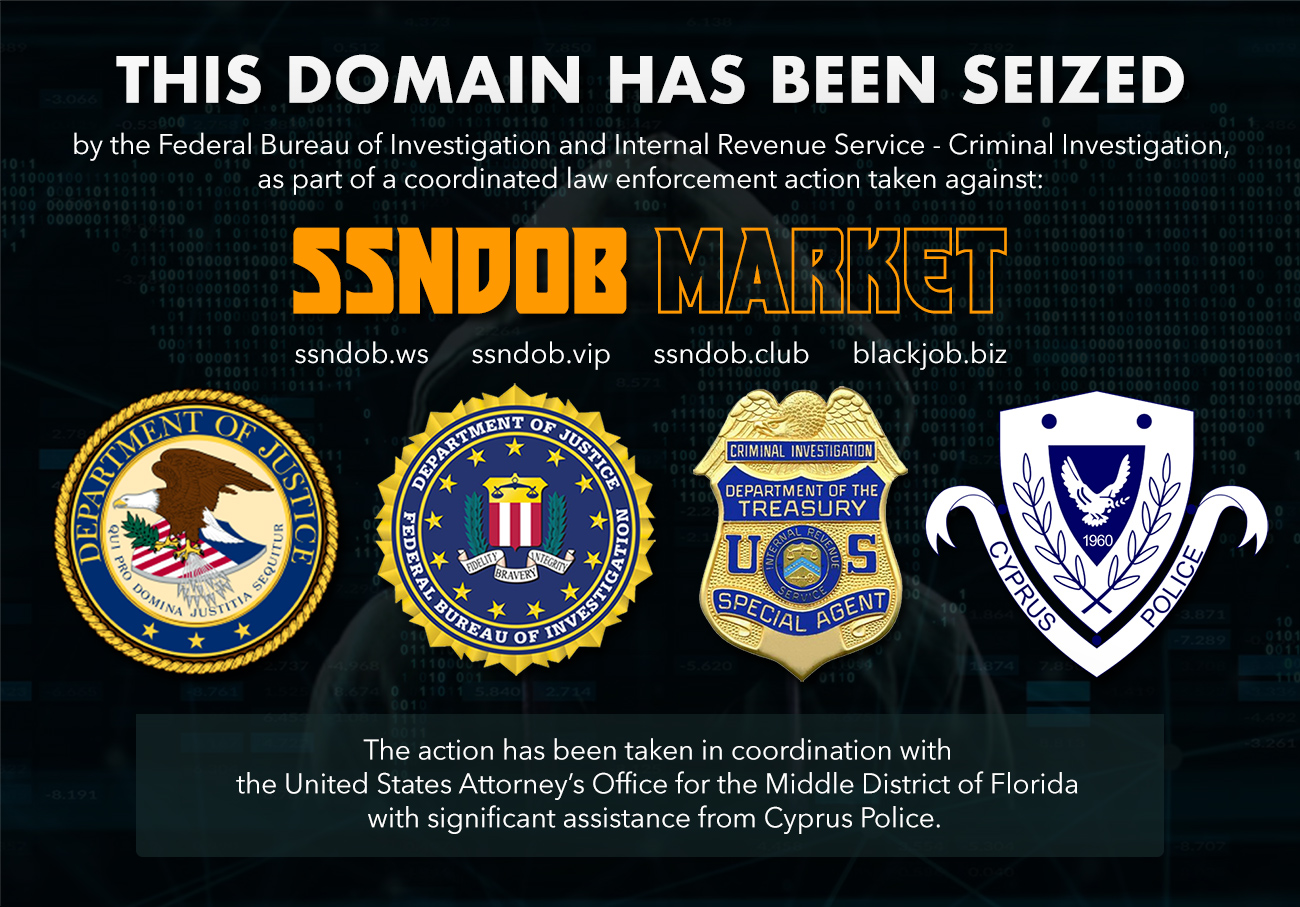
- Founded: 2012
- Dissolved: June 2022

SSNDOB was an online marketplace that sold stolen Social Security numbers, birth dates and other personal information of U.S. citizens starting in 2012 until it was shut down in June 2022 following a U.S. government seizure. It used the domain names ssndob.ws, ssndob.vip, ssndob.club, and blackjob.biz.

== Operations ==
In 2013 Brian Krebs reported that SSNDOB, at the time using the domain ssndob.ru, was selling access to consumer credit reports for US$15, driver's license records for $4 and background reports for $12 per report. A "full" record included the person's full name, address, phone number, date of birth and Social Security number cost 50 cents. "Fulls" could also be searched by date of birth for $1 and ZIP code for $1.50. He also reported that the site initially obtained its information by hacking LexisNexis, Short Hills, Dun & Bradstreet, and Kroll Inc.. Krebs learned this after SSNDOB itself was hacked. As a result of his reporting, Krebs's website faced a DDoS attack and his house was swatted.

Since April 2015, SSNDOB accepted payment in Bitcoin, receiving nearly $22 million before it was shut down. SSNDOB transferred more than US$100,000 in Bitcoin to Joker's Stash, a darknet marketplace selling stolen personal information, leading to suspicion that the two sites were linked.

At the time it was shut down, the site had information on about 24 million U.S. citizens.

== Shutdown ==
On June 7, 2022, police in Cyprus seized SSNDOB's servers, which were operated by a Cyprus resident who was cooperating with authorities. At the same time, the U.S. Department of Justice announced they had seized SSNDOB's domains.
