= Numident =

Database of the US Social Security Administration

Numident, or "Numerical Identification System," is the Social Security Administration's computer database file of an abstract of the information contained in an application for a United States Social Security number (Form SS-5). It contains the name of the applicant, place and date of birth, and other information. The Numident file contains all Social Security numbers since they first were issued in 1936.

== History of cleanup recommendations and actions ==
A March 2015 OIG audit (Numberholders Age 112 or Older Who Did Not Have a Death Entry on the Numident, A-06-14-34030) that identified roughly 6.5 million numberholders age 112+ with no death entry on the Numident (while only about 35 people worldwide were known to be that age). SSA later added death information to about 1.5 million of those older records but left the broader problem unaddressed.

The July 31, 2023 SSA Office of the Inspector General audit report (Numberholders Age 100 or Older Who Did Not Have Death Information on the Numident, A-06-21-51022) found that Numident contained approximately 18.9 million records for people born in 1920 or earlier that had no death information. At the time, the Census Bureau estimated only about 86,000 living U.S. residents age 100 or older. Of those 18.9 million records, roughly 18.4 million (about 98%) were not in current payment status and had no earnings reported to SSA in the prior 50 years; only about 44,000 were receiving benefits. SSA under the Biden administration declined, citing costs of up to ~$9.7M.

=== DOGE records cleanup ===
In 2025, the Department of Government Efficiency participated in an effort to clean up Numident records that did not include a date of death. Initially, their announcements claimed that millions of people older than 110 years were fraudulently collecting Social Security benefits. However, it was later clarified by SSA that these are merely records of Social Security numbers issued to people whose death dates are not known, and who are not collecting any benefits. This death-date work substantially addresses the long-standing OIG findings and recommendations that prior SSA leadership had declined primarily on cost and limited-program-benefit grounds.

On August 26, 2025, a whistleblower filed a complaint that DOGE had uploaded a live copy of Numident to an insecure cloud server.

== See also ==
- Death Master File
