= Homeless Management Information Systems =

Homeless Management Information System (HMIS) is a class of database applications used to confidentially aggregate data on homeless populations served in the United States. Such software applications record and store client-level information on the characteristics and service needs of homeless persons. An HMIS is typically a web-based software application that homeless assistance providers use to coordinate care, manage their operations, and better serve their clients.

HMIS implementations can encompass geographic areas ranging from a single county to an entire state. An HMIS knits together homeless assistance providers within a community and creates a more coordinated and effective housing and service delivery system.

The United States Department of Housing and Urban Development (HUD) and other planners and policymakers at the federal, state and local levels use aggregate HMIS data to obtain better information about the extent and nature of homelessness over time. Specifically, an HMIS can be used to produce an unduplicated count of homeless persons, understand patterns of service use, and measure the effectiveness of homeless programs.

Homeless Management Information Systems were first developed in the late 1990s in response to a mandate by Congress requiring States to collect this data as a condition of receiving federal money from HUD to serve homeless populations. The impetus behind this mandate was to reduce and eventually solve homelessness, a problem which could never be solved if it was not understood and if progress toward that goal was not tracked.

HUD mandated that each Continuum of Care (CoC) for the Homeless must implement an HMIS, but they did not require the use of a particular application. They do, however, provide specifications which all HMIS software must meet for collection and reporting of data. Some CoCs utilize locally developed or 'homegrown' software, but the majority adopted one of a number of commercially available HMIS applications. In July 2004, HUD published the HMIS Data and Technical Standards in the Federal Register, with the intent of standardizing collection of client and program-level data on homeless service usage among programs within a community and across all communities. In March 2010, HUD published a revision of the HMIS Data Standards, updated to incorporate data collection required for the Homelessness Prevention and Rapid Re-Housing Program (HPRP), which was funded under the American Recovery and Reinvestment Act of 2009; to align with intended changes to program-level reporting requirements; and to address feedback from CoCs requesting clarification and modification of some of the previous data elements.

Most HMIS applications also serve as outcome-based systems that facilitate timely, efficient, and effective access to needed services and supports for persons who are homeless. For instance, percentage of individuals who are in permanent housing at the time they exit a program is a metric used for evaluation. Other data fields focus on developing a picture of unduplicated counts, use of specific services and the effectiveness of the local homeless assistance systems.

HUD, apparently finding HMIS to be helpful in evaluating success in different grantee jurisdictions, and in reporting to Congress, has begun a renewed emphasis on having its Continuum of Care grantees convert to HMIS. 2010–2011 awards will be affected by metrics under HMIS and so some jurisdictions are moving quickly to bring their service providers into compliance.
