= National Automated Fingerprint Identification System =

Australian government biometric database

The National Automated Fingerprint Identification System (NAFIS) is an Australian fingerprint and palm print database and matching system to assist law enforcement agencies across Australia and the Department of Immigration and Border Protection to establish the identity of persons and to help solve crimes and for other purposes.

NAFIS was established in 1986, and an upgraded system commenced operations in April 2001 and provides technological improvements in fingerprint matching. It has shown to be very reliable in fingerprint matching.
