= Government Electronic Directory Services =

The Government Electronic Directory Services (GEDS) provide a directory of the Public Service of Canada for all regions across Canada. It is managed by Shared Services Canada.

The Canadian government's Information Technology Services Branch developed GEDS to integrate two directory services that it manages (the Government of Canada telephone directories and the Email Address Exchange Service (EMAX)).

Individual federal departments are responsible for maintaining information in GEDS (e.g. staff changes).

Users can search for federal employees by surname, given name, telephone number, title, role, or organization. It is also a useful system to learn the hierarchical structure of organizations within the Canadian public service.
