= Integrated Automated Fingerprint Identification System =

American fingerprint database

The Integrated Automated Fingerprint Identification System (IAFIS) is a computerized system maintained by the Federal Bureau of Investigation (FBI) from 1999 to 2014. It is a national automated fingerprint identification and criminal history system. IAFIS provides automated fingerprint search capabilities, latent searching capability, electronic image storage, and electronic exchange of fingerprints and responses. IAFIS houses the fingerprints and criminal histories of 70 million subjects in the criminal master file, 31 million civil prints and fingerprints from 73,000 known and suspected terrorists processed by the U.S. or by international law enforcement agencies.

Employment background checks cause citizens to be permanently recorded in the system. For instance, the State of Washington mandates that all applicants seeking employment in an inpatient setting that houses vulnerable minors (such as children who are mentally challenged, physically or emotionally ill) are fingerprinted and entered into IAFIS as part of their background check in order to determine if the applicant has any record of criminal behavior.

Fingerprints are voluntarily submitted to the FBI by local, state, and federal law enforcement agencies. These agencies acquire the fingerprints through criminal arrests or from non-criminal sources, such as employment background checks and the US-VISIT program. The FBI then catalogs the fingerprints along with any criminal history linked with the subject.

Law enforcement agencies can then request a search in IAFIS to identify crime scene (latent) fingerprints obtained during criminal investigations. Civil searches are also performed, but the FBI charges a fee and the response time is slower.

A more advanced Next Generation Identification system became operational in 2011.

== Technology ==
The device used for scanning live fingerprints into AFIS is called Live scan. The process of obtaining the prints by way of LiveScan employs rolling prints or placing flat impressions onto a glass platen above a camera unit. The process of obtaining prints by placing a ten-print card (prints taken using ink) onto a flatbed or high-speed scanner is called CardScan (or occasionally DeadScan). In addition to these devices, there are other devices to capture prints from crime scenes, as well as devices (both wired and wireless) to capture one or two live finger impressions. The most common method of acquiring fingerprint images remains the inexpensive ink pad and paper form. Scanning forms ("fingerprint cards") with a forensic AFIS complies with standards established by the FBI and National Institute of Standards and Technology (NIST).

To match a print, a fingerprint technician scans in the print in question, and computer algorithms are utilized to mark all minutia points, cores, and deltas detected on the print. In some systems, the technician is allowed to perform a review of the points that the software has detected, and submits the feature set to a one-to-many (1:N) search. The better commercial systems provide fully automated processing and searching ("lights-out") of print features. The fingerprint image processor will generally assign a "quality measure" that indicates if the print is acceptable for searching.

== Speed ==
The average response time for an electronic criminal fingerprint submission is about 27 minutes, while electronic civil submissions are processed within an hour and 12 minutes. IAFIS processed more than 61 million ten-print submissions during fiscal year 2010.

== See also ==
- Combined DNA Index System—U.S. DNA system
- Eurodac—the European fingerprint database for identifying asylum seekers and irregular border-crossers
- National Automated Fingerprint Identification System—Australian system
