= Death Master File =

US Social Security Administration database of deaths

The Death Master File (DMF) is a computer database file made available by the United States Social Security Administration since 1980. It is known commercially as the Social Security Death Index (SSDI). The file contains information about persons who had Social Security numbers and whose deaths were reported to the Social Security Administration from 1962 to the present; or persons who died before 1962, but whose Social Security accounts were still active in 1962. As of 2018, the file contained information on 111 million deaths.

In 2011, some records were removed from the file. Specifically, ZIP Code information (last known residence and last benefit payment address) was stripped due to identity theft concerns. Public updates to the Social Security Death Index ceased entirely in 2014. Since that time, access to newly reported deaths has been restricted to approved entities through the Limited Access DMF system, which requires certification under U.S. Department of Commerce regulations (15 C.F.R. Part 1110).

== Overview ==
The data includes:

- Name (given name, surname), since 1990s the middle initial
- Date of birth (year, month, day)
- Date of death (year, month), since 2000 the day of month
- Social Security number
- Whether death has been verified or a death certificate has been observed.

In 2011, the following information was removed:

- Last ZIP code of the person while alive
- ZIP code to which the lump sum death benefit was sent, if applicable

The Death Master File is a subset of the Social Security Administration's Numident database file, computerized in 1961, which contains information about all Social Security numbers issued since 1936. The Death Master File is considered a public document under the Freedom of Information Act, and monthly and weekly updates of the file are sold by the National Technical Information Service of the U.S. Department of Commerce. Knowing that a patient died is important in many observational clinical studies and is important for medical research. It is also used by financial and credit firms and government agencies to match records and prevent identity fraud.

The Death Master File, in its SSDI form, is also used extensively by genealogists. Lorretto Dennis Szucs and Sandra Hargraves Luebking report in The Source: A Guidebook of American Genealogy (1997) that the total number of deaths in the United States from 1962 to September 1991 is estimated at 58.2 million. Of that number, 42.5 million (73 percent) are found in the Death Master File. Other research published by the Social Security Administration in 2002 suggests that for most years since 1973, 93 percent to 96 percent of deaths of individuals aged 65 or older were included in the DMF. Today the number of deaths, at any age, reported to the Death Master File is around 95 percent.

== Distribution ==
Social Security Administration distributes the file via National Technical Information Service. In May 2013, the cost of a single download (with no weekly, monthly or quarterly annual subscription costs) was $1825.

== Errors and omissions ==
The Social Security Administration has estimated that about 16 million decedents were missing from the file, leading to government benefits being paid out improperly; the total amount of improper payments in 2014 was estimated at $124 billion.

Conversely, the Social Security Administration estimates that roughly 12,000 living people are added to the file annually, potentially due to clerical error. Because the file is used widely for commercial purposes, an erroneous listing can lead to not only a cessation of government benefits, but also the freezing of bank accounts, the inability to buy or rent property, and mistaken accusations of identity theft. The Office of the Inspector General called the error rate "very low", but noted that "SSA’s erroneous death entries can lead to mistaken benefit terminations and cause severe financial hardship and distress to affected people. ... When errors like this occur, it can be a long and difficult process to resurrect your financial life."

In 2024, a follow-up audit by the Social Security Administration’s Office of the Inspector General found that over 900,000 death records from the SSA’s internal Numident database had still not been included in the DMF, despite being valid. The SSA declined to include most of the records, citing data quality issues, though it had previously added approximately 7.7 million other records flagged by an earlier audit.

In 2025, multiple media outlets reported that the U.S. Social Security Administration had improperly added thousands of living individuals to the Death Master File as part of a broader data policy change. Many were later removed after proving they were alive, and advocacy groups raised concerns about political misuse of the database.

== Use in immigration enforcement ==
In April 2025, CBS News, The New York Times and The Washington Post reported that over 6,000 living people were added to the Death Master File at the direction of the Trump administration. The additions to the Death Master File reportedly consist of immigrants that were granted parole under policies initiated by the Biden administration.

== See also ==
- Credit zombie
- National Death Index
