= Next Generation Identification =

Project of the US Federal Bureau of Investigation

Next Generation Identification (NGI) is a project of the Federal Bureau of Investigation (FBI). The project's goal is to expand the capabilities of the Integrated Automated Fingerprint Identification System (IAFIS), which is currently used by law enforcement to identify subjects by their fingerprints and to look up their criminal history. The NGI system will be a more modular system (allowing easy expandability). It will also have more advanced lookup capabilities, incorporating palm print, iris, and facial identification. The FBI first used this system in February 2011.

The system was developed by Lockheed Martin in partnership with Safran and with a number of technology companies.

By 2012 the database had 13.6 million images representing 7–8 million individuals, 16 million images by mid-2013, and over 100 million records by 2014. The database includes both non-criminal and criminal face images, including at least 4.3 million face images taken for non-criminal purposes added by 2015. These noncriminal photos come in part from background check images submitted by employers to the FBI. By December 2015 the database had 70.8 million criminal records and 38.5 million civil records.

In 2016 a group of organizations published a letter condemning an FBI proposal to make the database exempt from the Privacy Act provision that allows individuals to inspect their own records in the database to check for accuracy and fairness. Signatories included La Raza, Color of Change, Amnesty International, National LGBTQ Task Force, as well as the companies Uber and Lyft. The DOJ granted this exemption in 2017.

The FBI accepted a 20 percent error rate in its facial recognition technology, according to a 2010 document obtained via FOIA.

== Organizations involved in the project ==
- Accenture
- BAE Systems
- createTank
- Global Science & Technology (GST)
- IBM
- Ingersoll Consulting Information Solutions (ICIS)
- Innovative Management & Technology Services (IMTS)
- Lakota Software Solutions, Inc
- Lockheed Martin
- National Center for State Courts (NCSC)
- NTT Data
- Platinum Solutions
