= John Pritzlaff =

John Pritzlaff may refer to:

- John C. Pritzlaff (1820–1900), Prussian-American businessman
- John C. Pritzlaff Jr. (1925–2005), American politician
- John Pritzlaff Hardware Company, a Wisconsin company founded by John C. Pritzlaff in 1850
