= NSA Inspector General Act of 2013 =

NSA Inspector General Act
- Long title: To require the Director of the National Security Agency and the Inspector General of the National Security Agency to be appointed by the President, by and with the advice and consent of the Senate, and for other purposes.
- Announced in: the 113th United States Congress
- Sponsored by: Mark Sanford
- Number of co-sponsors: 33

Legislative history
- Introduced in the House as H.R. 3436 by Mark Sanford (R–SC) on October 30, 2013

The NSA Inspector General Act was a proposed bill introduced by Mark Sanford on October 30, 2013. It would "require the Director of the National Security Agency and the Inspector General of the National Security Agency to be appointed by the President, by and with the advice and consent of the Senate".

The bill was authored in light of the Global Surveillance Disclosures of 2013. At the time, the Inspector General was appointed by the Director of the NSA. Supporters of the bill argue that this arrangement "curbs their oversight effectiveness because the Director can remove them."

The bill was never passed.

Subsequently, the Intelligence Authorization Act for Fiscal Year 2014 elevated the NSA to an establishment Inspector General under the Inspector General Act, requiring the NSA Inspector General to be appointed by the President and confirmed by the Senate. The Intelligence Authorization Act for Fiscal Year 2014 was signed into law by President Obama on July 7, 2014.

== Co-sponsors ==
Co-sponsors in the House include Paul Broun, Mick Mulvaney, Alan Grayson, Kerry Bentivolio, Tom Rice, Eleanor Holmes Norton, Thomas Massie, Justin Amash, Trey Gowdy, Jeff Duncan, Joe Wilson, and James Sensenbrenner.

== See also ==
- USA Freedom Act
