= Jim Sensenbrenner =

American politician (born 1943)

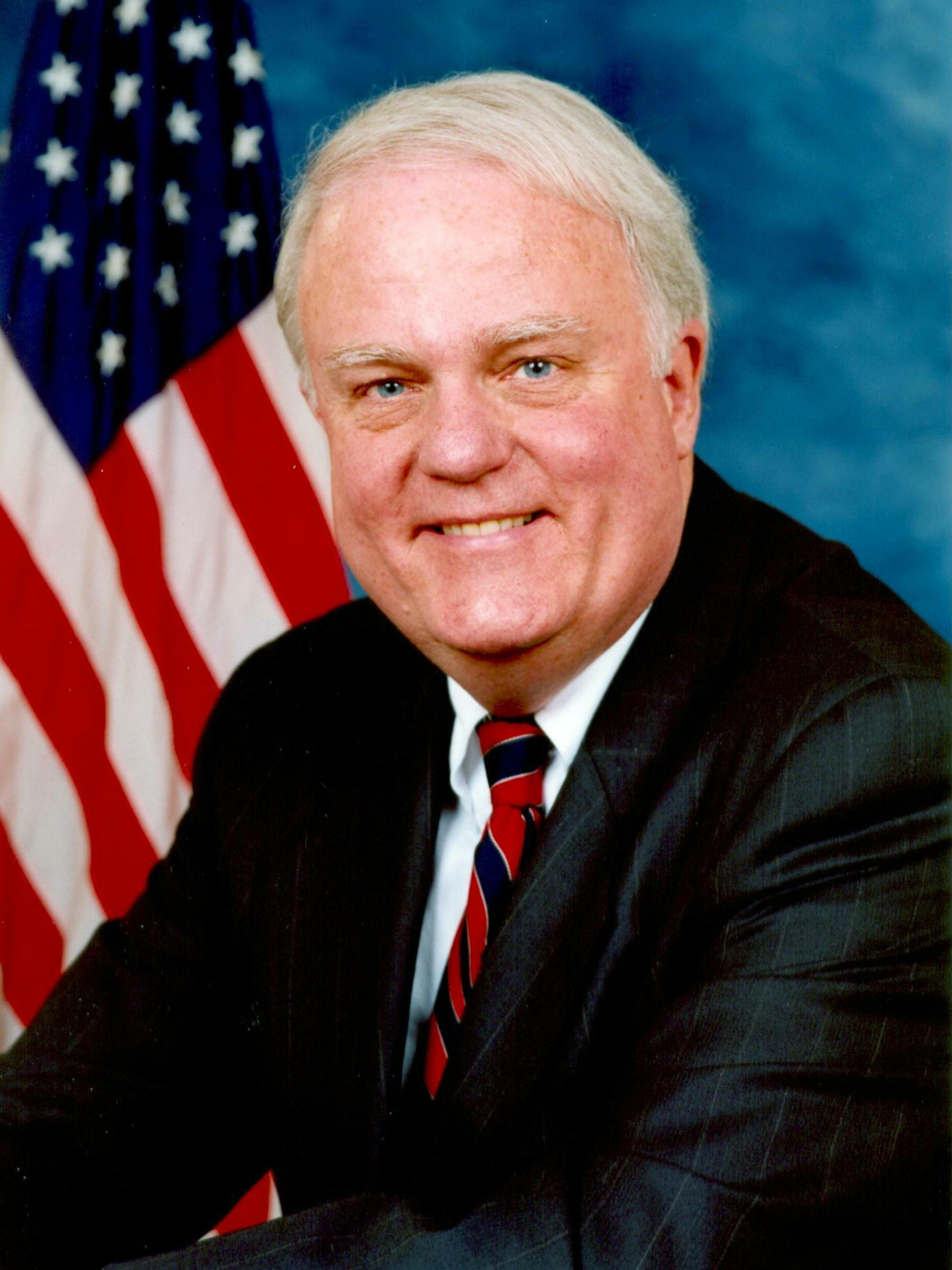

Chair of the House Judiciary Committee
- In office January 3, 2001 – January 3, 2007
- Preceded by: Henry Hyde
- Succeeded by: John Conyers

Chair of the House Science Committee
- In office January 3, 1997 – January 3, 2001
- Preceded by: Bob Walker
- Succeeded by: Sherwood Boehlert

Member of the U.S. House of Representatives from Wisconsin
- In office January 3, 1979 – January 3, 2021
- Preceded by: Bob Kasten
- Succeeded by: Scott Fitzgerald
- Constituency: 9th district (1979–2003); 5th district (2003–2021)

Member of the Wisconsin Senate from the 4th district
- In office April 8, 1975 – January 3, 1979
- Preceded by: Bob Kasten
- Succeeded by: Rod Johnston

Member of the Wisconsin State Assembly
- In office January 1, 1973 – April 2, 1975
- Preceded by: Constituency established
- Succeeded by: Rod Johnston
- Constituency: 10th district
- In office January 6, 1969 – January 1, 1973
- Preceded by: Nile Soik
- Succeeded by: Constituency abolished
- Constituency: 25th Milwaukee County

Personal details
- Born: Frank James Sensenbrenner Jr. June 14, 1943 (age 83) Chicago, Illinois, U.S.
- Party: Republican
- Spouse: Cheryl Warren (m. 1977; died 2020)
- Children: 2
- Relatives: John C. Pritzlaff (great-great-grandfather); James C. Kerwin (great-grandfather); F. Joseph Sensenbrenner Jr. (2nd cousin)
- Education: Stanford University (BA); University of Wisconsin, Madison (JD)
- Sensenbrenner's voice Sensenbrenner supporting a resolution recognizing Ozaukee County as the birthplace of Flag Day. Recorded June 14, 2004

Frank James Sensenbrenner Jr. (/ˈsɛnsənbrɛnər/; born June 14, 1943) is an American politician who represented Wisconsin's 5th congressional district in the United States House of Representatives from 1979 to 2021 (numbered as the 9th district until 2003). He is a member of the Republican Party.

He is the former chairman of the House Science Committee and the former chairman of the House Judiciary Committee; when the Republicans lost control of the House, he finished his six-year term as chairman and was not chosen as the Judiciary Committee's ranking minority member (that honor went to Lamar S. Smith of Texas). He served as the ranking Republican on the House Select Committee for Energy Independence and Global Warming from 2007 to 2011 before Republicans abolished the committee after regaining control of the House. At the time of his retirement, Sensenbrenner was the most senior member of the Wisconsin delegation and the second most senior member in the House.

Sensenbrenner announced in September 2019 that he would not run for re-election in 2020.

== Early life, education, and early political career ==
Sensenbrenner was born in Chicago, Illinois. His great-grandfather, Frank J. Sensenbrenner, was involved in the early marketing of Kotex sanitary napkin and served as the second president of Kimberly-Clark. His grandfather, John S. Sensenbrenner, also spent his entire career working for Kimberly-Clark. Sensenbrenner was raised in Shorewood, Wisconsin, and attended the private Milwaukee Country Day School in Whitefish Bay, from which he graduated in 1961. He matriculated at Stanford University, graduating with a B.A. in political science in 1965. He received a Juris Doctor degree from the University of Wisconsin Law School in 1968. Sensenbrenner served as staff assistant to California U.S. Congressman J. Arthur Younger and Wisconsin State Senator Jerris Leonard.

== Wisconsin legislature (1969–1979) ==
Sensenbrenner was elected to the Wisconsin State Assembly in 1968, the same year he graduated from law school. He served in the State Assembly until 1975, and in the Wisconsin State Senate from 1975 to early 1979.

== U.S. House of Representatives (1979–2021) ==
=== Elections ===
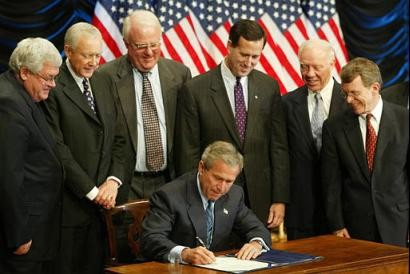
Sensenbrenner watches as President George W. Bush signs the Partial-Birth Abortion Ban Act, November 2003.

When 9th District Congressman Bob Kasten vacated his seat to run for governor in 1978, Sensenbrenner ran in the election to succeed him in what was then the 9th District, which covered most of Milwaukee's northern and western suburbs. He defeated his primary opponent, State Assemblywoman Susan Engeleiter, by 589 votes with a plurality of 43%. He defeated Democratic lawyer Matt Flynn in November 1978 with 61% and was reelected 20 more times with no substantive opposition, sometimes running unopposed in what has long been the most Republican district in Wisconsin. His district was renumbered as the 5th after the 2000 census, when Wisconsin lost a district. He never won re-election with less than 62% of the vote. In fact, his worst two re-elections were in 2004, when he defeated UW-Milwaukee professor Bryan Kennedy with 67% of the vote, and in 2006 defeated him in a rematch with 62%.

On September 4, 2019, he announced that he would not seek a 22nd term in office and would retire from Congress at the conclusion of the 116th Congress.

=== Impeachment manager role ===
In 1998, Sensenbrenner was one of the House managers (prosecutors) in the 1999 impeachment trial of President Bill Clinton. He was also one of the impeachment managers for three other impeachment trials (all for federal judges): the 1989 trial of Walter Nixon, the 2009 trial of Samuel B. Kent, and the 2010 trial of Thomas Porteous. He served as a manager in more federal impeachments than anyone else in American history.

=== Security ===
Sensenbrenner introduced the USA PATRIOT Act to the House on October 23, 2001. Although the primary author was U.S. Assistant Attorney General Viet D. Dinh, Sensenbrenner has been recognized as "one of the architects of the Patriot Act".

In November 2004, Sensenbrenner and California Congressman Duncan L. Hunter objected to provisions of a bill that created the 9/11 Commission. In 2006, the NRA successfully lobbied Sensenbrenner to add a provision to the Patriot Act re-authorization that requires Senate confirmation of ATF director nominees.

In 2005, Sensenbrenner authored the Real ID Act, which requires scrutiny of citizenship before issuing drivers' licenses to make it more difficult for terrorists and criminals to alter their identities by counterfeiting documents. He attached the controversial act as a rider on military spending bill HR418, which the Senate passed without debate.

On June 17, 2005, Sensenbrenner, the chair of the House Judiciary Committee, ended a meeting where Republicans and Democrats were debating the renewal of the USA PATRIOT Act and walked out in response to Democratic members discussing human rights violations at the Guantanamo Bay detainment camp and the ongoing Iraq War. He ordered the court reporter to halt transcription of the proceedings and C-SPAN to shut off its cameras. Sensenbrenner defended his actions by stating that the Democrats and witnesses had violated House rules in discussing issues unrelated to the subject of the meeting. Democrats have claimed that his walkout was contrary to House parliamentary procedure, which is to adjourn either on motion or without objection.

In June 2013, Sensenbrenner objected to the FBI and NSA's use of the PATRIOT Act to routinely collect phone metadata from millions of Americans without any suspicion of wrongdoing. He said:

The Bureau's broad application for phone records was made under the so-called business records provision of the Act. I do not believe the broadly drafted FISA order is consistent with the requirements of the Patriot Act. Seizing phone records of millions of innocent people is excessive and un-American.

He released a statement saying: "While I believe the Patriot Act appropriately balanced national security concerns and civil rights, I have always worried about potential abuses."

He also criticized the PRISM program, stating that the Patriot Act did not authorize the program.

Sensenbrenner supported the Amash–Conyers Amendment, a plan to defund the NSA's telephone surveillance program. "Never, he said, did he intend to allow the wholesale vacuuming up of domestic phone records, nor did his legislation envision that data dragnets would go beyond specific targets of terrorism investigations." The Amendment fell seven votes short of the number it needed to pass.

In October 2013, he introduced the USA Freedom Act in the House, a bill designed to curtail the powers of the NSA and end the NSA's dragnet phone data collection program. The bill is supported by civil liberties advocacy groups, including the American Civil Liberties Union.

=== Terri Schiavo case ===
In March 2005, Sensenbrenner sided with the parents and siblings in the Terri Schiavo case, who fought unsuccessfully in federal court to block the withdrawal of her feeding tube.

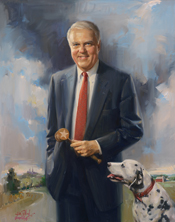
Sensenbrenner's official portrait, by George and Jim Pollard, 1998

=== Immigration ===
Sensenbrenner was the main sponsor of H.R. 4437, a bill passed by the House in 2005 that would provide additional criminal penalties for aiding and abetting illegal immigration to the United States. Sensenbrenner, in spite of unanimous Congressional support, attempted to delay a bill in December 2010 that would have been benefited Hotaru Ferschke, the Japanese-born widow of a United States Marine killed in combat. Congressman John Duncan was able to use "a loophole" to get the bill passed in spite of Sensenbrenner's objections. By adding language in the Senate indicating the bill would not impact the federal budget Sensenbrenner could no longer block the bill by himself according to House rules. The measure was passed unanimously.

=== Health care ===
On May 9, 2019, Sensenbrenner was one of four Republicans who voted for HR 986, a measure supported by all voting House Democrats intended to maintain protections of those with pre-existing medical conditions to have continued access to affordable medical insurance under the existing provisions of the Affordable Care Act.

=== Human services ===
On September 8, 2005, Sensenbrenner voted against a bill to provide $50 billion in emergency aid to victims of Hurricane Katrina. The bill passed and was signed into law by President George W. Bush.

=== Intellectual property ===
On December 16, 2005, Sensenbrenner introduced the Digital Transition Content Security Act. He helped lead the effort to pass the Intellectual Property Protection Act of 2006, which was supported by large copyright holders and opposed by fair use activists.

=== Online privacy ===
In 2017, Sensenbrenner joined fellow Congressional Republicans in overturning policies put in place by the Obama administration that required telecommunication carriers like Verizon, AT&T, and Comcast to allow customers to opt in or out from those companies' sharing their confidential information. When asked about the issue at a town hall, Sensenbrenner stated, "Nobody's got to use the Internet."

=== Separation of powers ===
In 2006, Sensenbrenner expressed outrage at the FBI raid of the congressional office of Democratic Representative William J. Jefferson, asserting constitutional concerns over separation of powers. He held Judiciary Committee hearings in May 2006 on this issue. One year before, on May 9, 2005, he suggested the creation of an "inspector general" on the federal Judiciary.

=== Animal rights ===
In fall 2006, the Animal Fighting Prohibition Enforcement Act unanimously passed the Senate, but Sensenbrenner used his position to block final House consideration of the legislation, even though the bill had 324 co-sponsors. The act creates felony-level penalties for animal fighting activities.

=== Foreign relations ===
Sensenbrenner was the only Republican to join House Speaker Nancy Pelosi's Congressional delegation to meet the Dalai Lama in Dharamsala, India during the March 2008 protests against China by Tibetans. While there he said, "In the US Congress, there is no division between Democrats and Republicans on the issue of protecting Tibetan culture and eliminating repression against Tibetans around the world."

Following the death of Nelson Mandela, Sensenbrenner objected to the executive proclamation by President Barack Obama to lower the flags to half-staff to honor Mandela. He stated it was his belief that the American flag should only be flown at half-staff for Americans.

Sensenbrenner received important international recognitions. In 2014, the Japanese Government awarded him the Order of the Rising Sun, gold and silver stars. He is only the second American to receive the Robert Schuman Medal (2015) after President George H. W. Bush (2014).

=== Communications standards ===
Sensenbrenner believes in criminal prosecution of broadcasters and cable operators who violate decency standards, in contrast to the FCC regulatory methods. In July 2012, Sensenbrenner advocated amending the Espionage Act of 1917 to enable the prosecution of journalists involved in publishing leaks of state secrets.

=== Comment about Michelle Obama ===
In December 2011, the Milwaukee Journal Sentinel reported Sensenbrenner referred to First Lady Michelle Obama's "big butt" while talking to church members at a Christmas bazaar at St. Aidan's church in Hartford. Church member Ann Marsh-Meigs told the newspaper that she heard Sensenbrenner's remarks. She said the congressman was speaking about the first lady's efforts to combat childhood obesity, and added, "And look at her big butt." On December 22, Sensenbrenner's press secretary said Sensenbrenner had sent Obama a personal note and released a statement saying he regretted his "inappropriate comment". Sensenbrenner's office would not release the text of the note.

=== Rankings ===
Sensenbrenner has received high marks from the National Taxpayers Union, a non-profit organization that supports low taxes.

Sensenbrenner was named the 2006 "Man of the Year" by the conservative publication Human Events because of his immigration policies. In contrast, in the same year he was rated the second-worst member of the House by Rolling Stone, which dubbed him "the dictator". Also in 2006, the NRA lobbied Sensenbrenner to add a provision to the Patriot Act re-authorization that requires Senate confirmation of ATF director nominees.

=== Committee assignments ===
- Committee on the Judiciary
  - United States House Judiciary Subcommittee on Immigration and Border Security
  - United States House Judiciary Subcommittee on Crime, Terrorism, Homeland Security and Investigations (Chairman)
- United States House Committee on Foreign Affairs
  - United States House Foreign Affairs Subcommittee on Europe, Eurasia and Emerging Threats
  - United States House Foreign Affairs Subcommittee on Africa, Global Health, Global Human Rights and International Organizations

Caucus memberships

- Congressional Coalition on Adoption
- Congressional Grace Caucus
- United States Congressional International Conservation Caucus
- Friends of Norway Caucus
- Friends of Finland Caucus
- U.S.-Japan Caucus

== Personal life ==
In 1977, Sensenbrenner married Cheryl Warren, daughter of former state attorney general and U.S. District Court Judge Robert W. Warren. The couple have two sons, Frank (born 1981), and Bob (born 1984). Frank worked as a lobbyist for the Canadian embassy in Washington D.C. starting in 2007, although he didn't register with the U.S. as an agent for a foreign government. He is currently a visiting fellow at Johns Hopkins School of Advanced International Studies, his research focusing on Eurozone financial markets, and has blogged for the Huffington Post on Italian politics and the Vatican.

When not in Washington D.C., Sensenbrenner resides in Menomonee Falls, Wisconsin.

Sensenbrenner has a net worth of about $11.6 million. His net worth in 2010 was $9.9 million. He is an heir to the Kimberly-Clark family fortune, but no longer owns any Kimberly-Clark stock. His great-grandfather, Frank J. Sensenbrenner, who served as Kimberly-Clark's second president and CEO during the period Kimberly Clark developed Kotex and numerous other consumable goods, but the congressman has never served on the board or been directly involved with the company. He has put his money into stocks, as detailed in the Congressional Record. Sensenbrenner has also won lottery prizes three times, the largest, $250,000, in 1997.

Other notable ancestors of Sensenbrenner's include maternal great-great-grandfather John C. Pritzlaff, founder of Milwaukee-based John Pritzlaff Hardware Company, and paternal great-grandfather James C. Kerwin, a justice of the Wisconsin Supreme Court. His ancestry includes German, Irish, and Alsatian.

In August 2009, Sensenbrenner announced that he was diagnosed with prostate cancer. His doctor said the cancer was caught in the early stages when the cure rate is between 85 and 95 percent.

A former United Episcopalian, Sensenbrenner became a Catholic in August 2014.

Sensenbrenner's wife, Cheryl, died on June 15, 2020, in Alexandria, Virginia, after suffering a stroke six years earlier.

== Electoral history ==
=== Wisconsin Assembly, Milwaukee 25th district (1968, 1970) ===
Year	Election	Date	Elected				Defeated				Total	Plurality
1968	Primary	September 10	F. James Sensenbrenner	Republican	3,444	42.96%	Rod Johnston (inc.)	Rep.	2,772	34.58%	8,017	672
1968	Primary	September 10	F. James Sensenbrenner	Republican	3,444	42.96%	Richard W. Yeo	Rep.	849	10.59%	8,017	672
1968	Primary	September 10	F. James Sensenbrenner	Republican	3,444	42.96%	Lewis B. Rheinsmith	Rep.	820	10.23%	8,017	672
1968	Primary	September 10	F. James Sensenbrenner	Republican	3,444	42.96%	Thomas J. Aaron	Rep.	132	1.65%	8,017	672
1968	General	November 5	F. James Sensenbrenner	Republican	15,150	70.33%	Richard J. Regan	Dem.	6,390	29.67%	21,540	8,760
1970	General	November 3	F. James Sensenbrenner (inc.)	Republican	12,802	73.44%	Margaret Rounseville	Dem.	4,631	26.56%	17,433	8,171

=== Wisconsin Assembly, 10th district (1972, 1974) ===
Year	Election	Date	Elected				Defeated				Total	Plurality
1972	General	November 7	F. James Sensenbrenner	Republican	17,483	71.88%	Barbara Ulichny	Dem.	6,840	28.12%	24,323	10,643
1974	General	November 5	F. James Sensenbrenner (inc.)	Republican	12,579	72.19%	Charles J. Sykes	Dem.	4,847	27.81%	17,426	7,732

=== Wisconsin Senate, 4th district (1975, 1976) ===
Year	Election	Date	Elected				Defeated				Total	Plurality
1975	Special	April 1	F. James Sensenbrenner	Republican	16,605	72.63%	Robert A. Jakubiak	Dem.	6,258	27.37%	22,863	10,347
1976	General	November 2	F. James Sensenbrenner (inc.)	Republican	47,605	100.0%					47,605	47,605

=== U.S. House, Wisconsin 9th district (1978–2000) ===
Year	Election	Date	Elected				Defeated				Total	Plurality
1978	Primary	September 12	F. James Sensenbrenner	Republican	29,584	43.30%	Susan Engeleiter	Rep.	28,995	42.44%	68,325	589
1978	Primary	September 12	F. James Sensenbrenner	Republican	29,584	43.30%	Robert C. Brunner	Rep.	9,746	14.26%	68,325	589
1978	General	November 7	F. James Sensenbrenner	Republican	118,386	61.15%	Matthew J. Flynn	Dem.	75,207	38.85%	193,593	43,179
1980	General	November 4	F. James Sensenbrenner (inc.)	Republican	206,227	78.39%	Gary C. Benedict	Dem.	56,838	21.61%	263,065	149,389
1982	General	November 2	F. James Sensenbrenner (inc.)	Republican	111,503	100.0%					111,503	111,503
1984	General	November 6	F. James Sensenbrenner (inc.)	Republican	180,260	73.36%	John Krause	Dem.	64,145	26.11%	245,711	116,115
1984	General	November 6	F. James Sensenbrenner (inc.)	Republican	180,260	73.36%	Stephen K. Hauser	Const.	1,306	0.53%	245,711	116,115
1986	General	November 4	F. James Sensenbrenner (inc.)	Republican	138,766	78.22%	Thomas G. Popp	Dem.	38,636	21.78%	177,402	100,130
1988	General	November 8	F. James Sensenbrenner (inc.)	Republican	185,093	74.91%	Thomas J. Hickey	Dem.	62,003	25.09%	247,096	123,090
1990	General	November 6	F. James Sensenbrenner (inc.)	Republican	117,967	100.0%					117,967	117,967
1992	General	November 3	F. James Sensenbrenner (inc.)	Republican	192,898	69.70%	Ingrid K. Buxton	Dem.	77,362	27.95%	276,760	115,536
1992	General	November 3	F. James Sensenbrenner (inc.)	Republican	192,898	69.70%	David E. Marlow	Ind.	4,619	1.67%	276,760	115,536
1992	General	November 3	F. James Sensenbrenner (inc.)	Republican	192,898	69.70%	Jeffrey Holt Millikin	Lib.	1,881	0.68%	276,760	115,536
1994	General	November 8	F. James Sensenbrenner (inc.)	Republican	141,617	100.0%					141,617	141,617
1996	General	November 5	F. James Sensenbrenner (inc.)	Republican	197,910	74.50%	Floyd Brenholt	Dem.	67,740	25.50%	265,650	130,170
1998	General	November 3	F. James Sensenbrenner (inc.)	Republican	175,533	91.43%	Jeffrey M. Gonyo	Ind.	16,419	8.55%	191,976	159,114
1998	General	November 3	F. James Sensenbrenner (inc.)	Republican	175,533	91.43%	Anthony E. Deiss (write-in)	Tax.	24	0.01%	191,976	159,114
2000	General	November 7	F. James Sensenbrenner (inc.)	Republican	239,498	74.04%	Mike Clawson	Dem.	83,720	25.88%	323,455	155,778

=== U.S. House, Wisconsin 5th district (2002–2018) ===
Year	Election	Date	Elected				Defeated				Total	Plurality
2002	General	November 5	F. James Sensenbrenner	Republican	191,224	86.13%	Robert R. Raymond	Ind.	29,567	13.32%	222,012	161,657
2004	General	November 2	F. James Sensenbrenner (inc.)	Republican	271,153	66.57%	Bryan Kennedy	Dem.	129,384	31.77%	407,291	141,769
2004	General	November 2	F. James Sensenbrenner (inc.)	Republican	271,153	66.57%	Tim Peterson	Lib.	6,549	1.61%	407,291	141,769
2006	General	November 7	F. James Sensenbrenner (inc.)	Republican	194,669	61.76%	Bryan Kennedy	Dem.	112,451	35.68%	315,180	82,218
2006	General	November 7	F. James Sensenbrenner (inc.)	Republican	194,669	61.76%	Bob Levis	Grn.	4,432	1.41%	315,180	82,218
2006	General	November 7	F. James Sensenbrenner (inc.)	Republican	194,669	61.76%	Robert R. Raymond	Ind.	3,525	1.12%	315,180	82,218
2008	Primary	September 9	F. James Sensenbrenner (inc.)	Republican	47,144	78.27%	James Burkee	Rep.	13,078	21.71%	60,236	34,066
2008	General	November 4	F. James Sensenbrenner (inc.)	Republican	275,271	79.58%	Robert R. Raymond	Ind.	69,715	20.15%	345,899	205,556
2010	General	November 2	F. James Sensenbrenner (inc.)	Republican	229,642	69.32%	Todd P. Kolosso	Dem.	90,634	27.36%	331,258	139,008
2010	General	November 2	F. James Sensenbrenner (inc.)	Republican	229,642	69.32%	Robert R. Raymond	Ind.	10,813	3.26%	331,258	139,008
2012	General	November 6	F. James Sensenbrenner (inc.)	Republican	250,335	67.72%	Dave Heaster	Dem.	118,478	32.05%	369,664	131,857
2014	General	November 4	F. James Sensenbrenner (inc.)	Republican	231,160	69.45%	Chris Rockwood	Dem.	101,190	30.40%	332,826	129,970
2016	General	November 4	F. James Sensenbrenner (inc.)	Republican	260,706	69.45%	Khary Penebaker	Dem.	114,477	29.29%	390,844	146,229
2016	General	November 4	F. James Sensenbrenner (inc.)	Republican	260,706	69.45%	John Arndt	Lib.	15,324	3.92%	390,844	146,229
2018	Primary	August 14	F. James Sensenbrenner (inc.)	Republican	73,397	81.15%	Jennifer Hoppe Vipond	Rep.	17,011	18.81%	90,442	56,386
2018	General	November 6	F. James Sensenbrenner (inc.)	Republican	225,619	61.93%	Tom Palzewicz	Dem.	138,385	37.99%	364,288	87,234

U.S. House of Representatives
Preceded by Bob Kasten	Member of the U.S. House of Representatives from Wisconsin's 9th congressional district 1979–2003	Constituency abolished
Preceded by Bob Walker	Chair of the House Science Committee; 1997–2001	Succeeded by Sherwood Boehlert
Preceded by Henry Hyde	Chair of the House Judiciary Committee; 2001–2007	Succeeded by John Conyers
Preceded by Tom Barrett	Member of the U.S. House of Representatives from Wisconsin's 5th congressional district 2003–2021	Succeeded by Scott L. Fitzgerald
U.S. order of precedence (ceremonial)
Preceded by David Bonior as Former House Majority Whip	Order of precedence of the United States as Former U.S. Representative	Succeeded by Dave Obey as Former U.S. Representative
