= Pritzlaff =

Pritzlaff is a surname. Although mainly found in German-speaking countries, it is derived from a Slavic personal name. Notable people with the surname include:

- Donny Pritzlaff (born 1979), American freestyle wrestler
- John C. Pritzlaff (1820-1900), Prussian-American businessman
- John C. Pritzlaff Jr. (1925–2005), American politician
