= John C. Koch =

19th century American politician

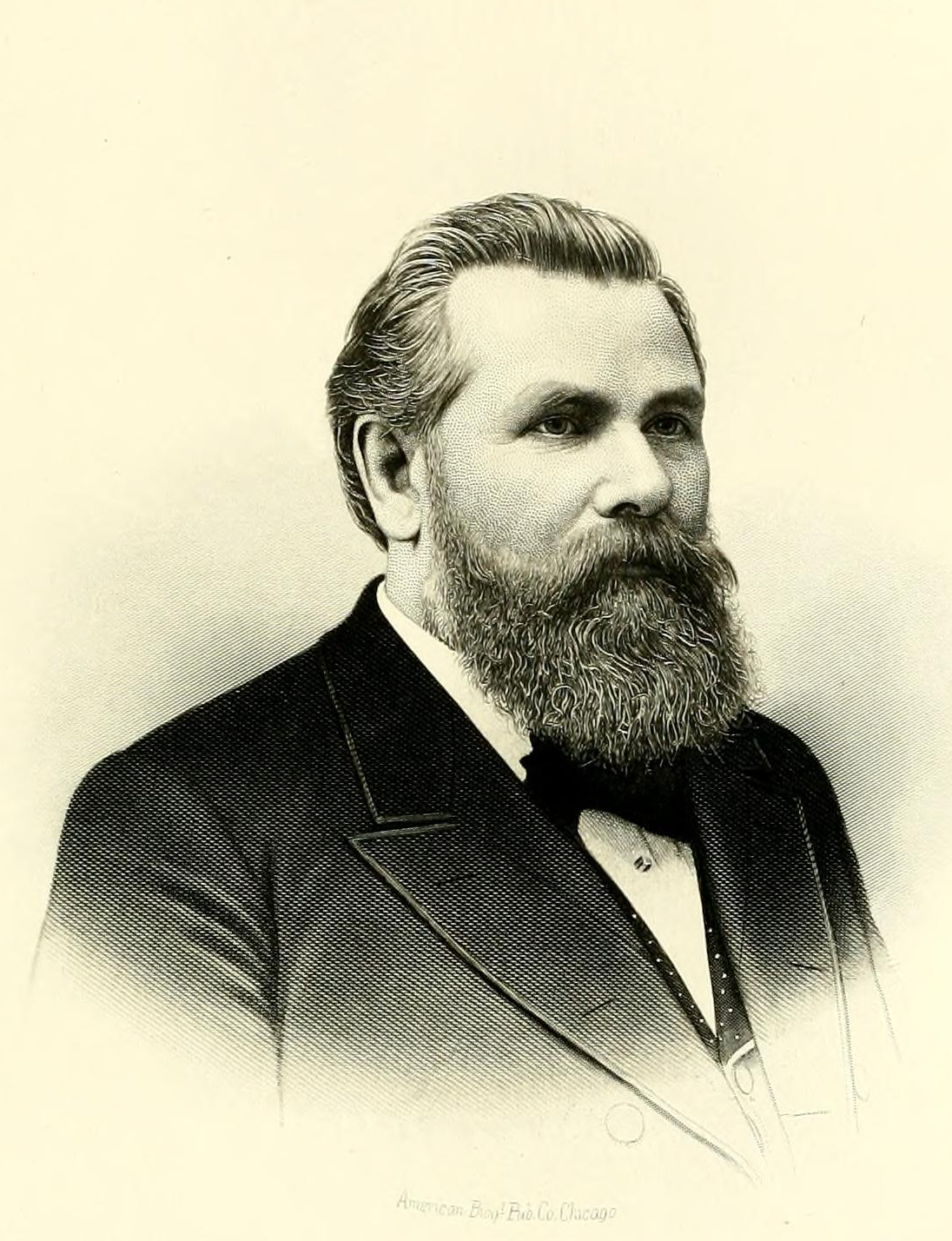
- From History of Milwaukee from its first settlement to the year 1895 (1895)

31st Mayor of Milwaukee, Wisconsin
- In office June 26, 1893 – April 1896
- Preceded by: Henry Hase (acting mayor)
- Succeeded by: William C. Rauschenberger

Personal details
- Born: John Carl August Koch; October 18, 1841 Rostock, Grand Duchy of Mecklenburg-Schwerin (Note: Many sources describe his place of birth as "near Hamburg", but some specifically state his place of birth as Rostock, Mecklenburg, which is somewhat near Hamburg. His sister was also known to have been born in Mecklenburg. Given these data points, I went with Rostock as his place of birth.)
- Died: November 8, 1907 (aged 66) Milwaukee, Wisconsin, U.S.
- Cause of death: Pneumonia
- Resting place: Forest Home Cemetery, Milwaukee
- Political party: Republican
- Spouse: Elizabeth Pritzlaff (m. 1864)
- Children: 9
- Relatives: John C. Pritzlaff (father-in-law)
- Occupation: Tinsmith, businessman
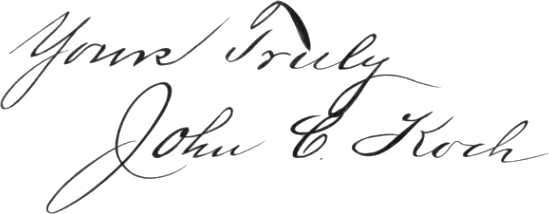
- Signature

John Carl August Koch (October 18, 1841 – November 8, 1907) was a German American immigrant, businessman, and Republican politician. He was the 31st mayor of Milwaukee, Wisconsin, and was largely responsible for the creation of Concordia University Wisconsin.

== Early life ==
John C. Koch was born on October 18, 1841, in the city of Rostock, in what is now northeast Germany. At the time of his birth, this was part of the Grand Duchy of Mecklenburg-Schwerin, in the German Confederation. He was educated until age 13 in his hometown, then emigrated to the United States with his family in 1854. They came directly to Milwaukee, Wisconsin, where Koch completed his education and apprenticed as a tinsmith with his father.

== Business career ==
In 1861, at age 20, Koch began working as foreman of the tinshop for the hardware firm John Pritzlaff & Company. While working there, he began courting Elizabeth Pritzlaff, the daughter of the company's founder, John C. Pritzlaff, and they married in 1864. By 1866, Koch was chief clerk and partner in the firm. In 1884, the company was incorporated as the John Pritzlaff Hardware Company, with Koch as vice president. Within a decade, management of the business was almost entirely turned over to Koch. It is largely attributed to Koch that the company grew from a small retail store in 1866 to one of the largest wholesale hardware sellers in the Midwest by 1894.

In addition to the hardware store, which was Koch's primary business interest, he was also president of the Koch & Loeber Company, which manufactured woodenware and supplies. He was president of the Milwaukee Exposition Company, a director of the Concordia Fire Insurance Company, and a member of the Milwaukee Advancement Association.

== Politics ==
Koch was a staunch Republican and was active for many years in the party. In 1892, the Republican Party of Wisconsin chose Koch as their nominee for Lieutenant Governor of Wisconsin. He had never run for elected office before and was selected largely because of his business and civic prominence—especially among Wisconsin's German protestant population. He ran alongside former U.S. senator John Coit Spooner, the Republican candidate for Governor, but both lost out to incumbent Democrats in the general election. For Koch's race, he fell 6,800 votes short, slightly better than Spooner's 7,600 vote deficit.

The following year, in June 1893, Peter J. Somers resigned as mayor of Milwaukee after he won a special election for United States House of Representatives. City council president Henry Hase served as acting mayor and a special election was called to fill the remaining year of the mayoral term. Koch received the nomination of the Republican Party and prevailed in the general election with a majority of about 3,300, out of about 20,100 votes cast.

Koch took office in the midst of the Panic of 1893, and his term as mayor was largely colored by this economic crisis. Shortly after his election, the Wisconsin Marine & Fire Insurance Company Bank was forced to halt payments, due to lack of funds. The Marine & Fire Insurance Bank was a legendary and well-respected financial institution, opened in 1839 and led in 1893 by U.S. senator John L. Mitchell. The bank's failure was a shock around the country, and was felt most acutely in Milwaukee, where most of the depositors resided. The city of Milwaukee was one of the bank's major creditors, and Koch was able to assist the rescue of bank with an offer to restructure their debt. The bank reopened in January 1894, to much congratulations and celebration.

Koch's time in office also coincided with the shocking assassination of Chicago mayor Carter Harrison by a delusional office-seeker. Koch, who also received numerous solicitations and threats from random citizens, significantly increased security at city hall.

Koch was seen as a capable and competent leader through the economic panic, and was re-elected to a full two-year term as mayor in 1894. That summer, at the 1894 Republican state convention, Koch was widely supported as a candidate for Governor of Wisconsin, but he ultimately withdrew his name and pledged to serve his full term as Mayor.

== Personal life ==
John C. Koch married Elizabeth Pritzlaff in 1864. They had 6 sons and 3 daughters.

In addition to his business and political ventures, Koch was deeply involved in education and religious issues. He was considered one of the most prominent Lutherans in Wisconsin, and worked within the church community to establish Concordia University Wisconsin, where he served on the board of trustees for much of the rest of his life.

Koch died at his home in Milwaukee on November 8, 1907, after suffering from pneumonia for three years.

== Electoral history ==
=== Wisconsin Lieutenant Governor (1892) ===
Wisconsin Lieutenant Gubernatorial Election, 1892
Party	Candidate	Votes	%	±%
General Election, November 8, 1892
Democratic	Charles Jonas (incumbent)	176,860	47.80%	−4.59%
Republican	John C. Koch	170,097	45.98%	+5.05%
Prohibition	Gilbert Shepard	13,122	3.55%	−0.84%
Populist	Martin Pattison	9,885	2.67%	
Plurality		6,763	1.83%	-9.64%
Total votes		369,964	100.0%	+21.37%
Democratic hold				

=== Milwaukee Mayor (1893, 1894) ===
Milwaukee, Wisconsin, Mayoral Special Election, 1893
Party	Candidate	Votes	%	±%
Special Election, June 24, 1893
Republican	John C. Koch	11,689	58.13%	
Democratic	Garrett Dunck	8,420	41.87%	
Plurality		3,269	16.26%	
Total votes		20,109	100.0%	
Republican gain from Democratic				

Milwaukee, Wisconsin, Mayoral Election, 1894
Party	Candidate	Votes	%	±%
General Election, April 3, 1894
Republican	John C. Koch (incumbent)	25,113	52.47%	−5.65%
Democratic	Herman Fehr	19,188	40.09%	−1.78%
Populist	C. A. Ulrich	3,557	7.43%	
Plurality		5,925	12.38%	-3.88%
Total votes		47,858	100.0%	+137.99%
Republican hold				

== Notes ==
Party political offices
Preceded by Joseph B. Treat	Republican nominee for Lieutenant Governor of Wisconsin	Succeeded by Emil Baensch
Political offices
Preceded by Henry Hase (acting mayor)	Mayor of Milwaukee, Wisconsin; June 26, 1893 – April 1896	Succeeded by William C. Rauschenberger
