= In re Opinions and Orders of This Court Containing Novel or Significant Interpretations of Law =

In re Opinions and Orders of This Court Containing Novel or Significant Interpretations of Law, Misc 16-01, United States Foreign Intelligence Surveillance Court, (October 19, 2016), or Motion of the American Civil Liberties Union for the Release of Court Records, or ACLU Motion for Release of Court Records, is a legal case filed by the American Civil Liberties Union before the FISA court. The motion requests that the FISA court release numerous rulings on "novel" interpretations of the law, made since from the court's inception through 2015, at which time such rulings were statutorily mandated to be made public under the USA Freedom Act. The court had interpreted the meaning of a broad swath of surveillance and cybersecurity laws without public disclosure, thereby creating a body of FISA court common law as precedent for subsequent cases, and which provides legal parameters for restricting and allowing actual surveillance practices.

Unlike most other legal proceedings in the United States, the controversial FISA court operates in secret for reasons of national security. From 2001 thorough 2015 it made a series of opinions that established a legal foundation (precedent) for expanding the government's surveillance activities. Among the opinions sought is that which interprets the original Foreign Intelligence Surveillance Act of 1978, in hopes it will expose an alleged Yahoo! program to scan large numbers of emails without a search warrant, possibly required by the 4th Amendment of the United States Constitution.

Critics of the Fisa court, like United States Senator Ron Wyden (Oregon) have said these classified rulings are a body of "secret law" which throws away congressionally enacted privacy restrictions. The United States executive branch, and others, respond that US surveillance practices and proceedings must be kept in complete secrecy for national security reasons.

The USA Freedom Act of 2015 mandates that the Fisa court release "novel" interpretations of the law (which thereby set precedent for future authority and cases), but does not clearly mandate retroactive disclosure. The ACLU argued that meaningful democratic debate and decisions about surveillance and cybersecurity cannot occur without the release of the precedent setting decisions prior to 2015.
