= 1896 Milwaukee mayoral election =

- April 8, 1896
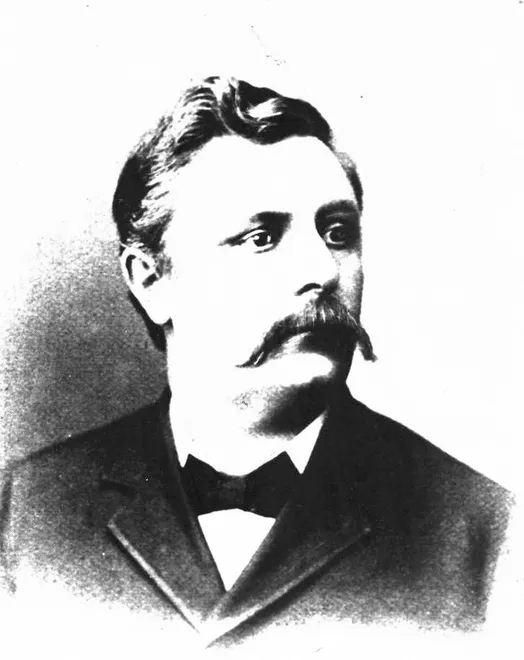

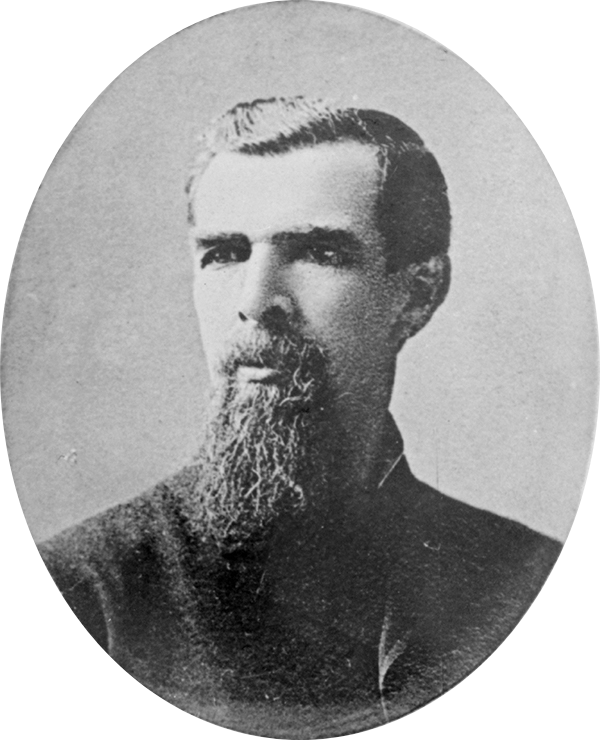
| Nominee | William C. Rauschenberger | Glenway Maxon | Henry Smith |
| Party | Republican | Democratic | Populist |
| Popular vote | 17,917 | 15,377 | 9,121 |
| Percentage | 41.82% | 35.89% | 21.29% |
Mayor before election
John C. Koch
Republican
Elected mayor
William C. Rauschenberger
Republican

An election for Mayor of Milwaukee was held on April 8, 1896. Milwaukee Common Council president William C. Rauschenberger was elected with 42% of the vote.

Candidates included Milwaukee Common Council president William C. Rauschenberger, attorney Glenway Maxon, former congressman Henry Smith, and Socialist John Pfluger.

== Results ==
Milwaukee mayoral election, 1896
| Party | Candidate | Votes | % |
|---|---|---|---|
| Republican | William C. Rauschenberger | 17,917 | 41.82 |
| Democratic | Glenway Maxon | 15,377 | 35.89 |
| Populist | Henry Smith | 9,121 | 21.29 |
| Social-Democratic | John Pfluger | 430 | 1.00 |
| Total votes | | 42,845 | 100.00 |
