= Americans for Responsibility in Washington =

Americans for Responsibility in Washington, known also as ResponsibilityPAC, was a political action campaign and bipartisan political movement based in Cedarburg, Wisconsin, a town located 15 minutes north of Milwaukee, Wisconsin. The campaign was abandoned on July 24, 2007, when its founders, Jeff Walz and James Burkee, redirected the website to announce their mutual campaign for U.S. House of Representatives.

== Founders ==
James Burkee, a history professor, and Jeff Walz, a political science professor, both teach at Concordia University Wisconsin.

James Burkee, an outspoken political conservative and active public speaker in the state of Wisconsin, is a longtime friend of co-founder and counterpart Jeff Walz. Walz is a political liberal or political progressive and an expert on politics and religion, specializing in the complex relationship between clergy and politics.

=== History ===
Walz and Burkee founded the organization after spending several previous election cycles on speaking tours in southeast Wisconsin. After launching a campaign website for a mutual race to the fifth congressional district of Wisconsin, the Americans for Responsibility in Washington project effectively closed when its site was redirected to what is now a campaign website for Burkee and Walz.
