= Freedom Act =

Freedom Act may refer to:

- Energy Independence and Security Act of 2007, US legislation which included the FREEDOM Act
- USA Freedom Act, a US law enacted on June 2, 2015, that restored and modified several provisions of the Patriot Act
