= Peter J. Somers =

American politician and judge (1850–1924)

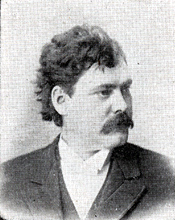

Member of the U.S. House of Representatives from Wisconsin's 4th district
- In office August 27, 1893 – March 3, 1895
- Preceded by: John L. Mitchell
- Succeeded by: Theobald Otjen

30th Mayor of Milwaukee
- In office December 6, 1890 – June 5, 1893
- Preceded by: George W. Peck
- Succeeded by: Henry Hase (acting); John C. Koch (elected)

Personal details
- Born: April 12, 1850 Menomonee Falls, Wisconsin, U.S.
- Died: February 15, 1924 (aged 73) Los Angeles, California, U.S.
- Resting place: Calvary Cemetery, East Los Angeles
- Party: Democratic
- Spouse: Catharine Murphy (m. 1878; died 1909)
- Children: 9

Peter J. Somers (April 12, 1850 – February 15, 1924) was an American lawyer, judge, and Democratic politician. He served as the 30th mayor of Milwaukee, Wisconsin, from December 1890 to June 1893, and represented the southern half of Milwaukee County in the U.S. House of Representatives for the 53rd Congress (1893–1895). He later moved to Nevada, where he served several years as a Nevada district court judge and chairman of the Nevada Democratic Party.

== Biography ==
Somers was born in Menomonee Falls, Wisconsin on April 12, 1850. He grew up in the state of Wisconsin. He became a lawyer and moved to Milwaukee, where he soon became involved in politics. Somers served as city attorney for Milwaukee. In 1890, he was elected to the Milwaukee Common Council and served as president of the Milwaukee Common Council.

He served as mayor of Milwaukee from December 6, 1890, to June 5, 1893, when he resigned, having won an election to fill a vacancy in the United States House of Representatives caused by the resignation of John L. Mitchell who was elected to the U.S. Senate. Somers took over as the representative of Wisconsin's 4th congressional district in the 53rd United States Congress. Somers, a lifelong member of the Democratic Party, was not renominated for a full term in 1894, and left Congress when his term expired in 1895. He is to date the last mayor of Milwaukee elected to higher office.

He continued practicing law in Milwaukee until 1905, when he moved to Reno, Nevada. He became a lawyer, judge for Esmeralda County, Nevada, and served for a time as chairman of the Nevada Democratic State Central Committee.

He died at his home in Los Angeles, California, on February 15, 1924. Somers was buried at Calvary Cemetery in Los Angeles.

Political offices
Preceded by George W. Peck	Mayor of Milwaukee; 1890–1893	Succeeded by Henry Hase (acting); John C. Koch (elected)
U.S. House of Representatives
Preceded by John L. Mitchell	Member of the U.S. House of Representatives from Wisconsin's 4th congressional district August 27, 1893 – March 3, 1895	Succeeded by Theobald Otjen
