= Roving wiretap =

Special kind of wiretap permit that follows the surveillance target

In United States law, a roving wiretap is a special kind of wiretap permit that follows the surveillance target. For instance, if a target attempts to defeat a regular wiretap by throwing away a phone and acquiring a new one, another surveillance order would usually need to be applied for to tap the new one. A "roving wiretap", once authorized, follows the target rather than a specific phone device, and would give the surveilling body permission to tap second and subsequent phones without applying for new surveillance orders.

In the US, it is allowed under amendments made to Title III of the Omnibus Crime Control and Safe Streets Act of 1968 (the "Wiretap Statute") in 1988 by the Electronic Communications Privacy Act, and was later expanded by section 604 of the Intelligence Authorization Act for Fiscal Year 1999. On 26 May 2011, the U.S. Senate voted to extend the provisions of the 2001 USA PATRIOT Act to search business records and allow for roving wiretaps. The roving wiretap provision of the Patriot Act briefly expired on 1 June 2015, but was restored the next day by enactment of the USA Freedom Act.
