= Barbara Ulichny =

American politician (born 1947)

Member of the Wisconsin Senate from the 4th district
- In office January 7, 1985 – January 4, 1993
- Preceded by: Rod Johnston
- Succeeded by: Gwen Moore

Member of the Wisconsin State Assembly
- In office January 3, 1983 – January 7, 1985
- Preceded by: Gary T. Dilweg
- Succeeded by: Cathy Zeuske
- Constituency: 4th district
- In office January 1, 1979 – January 3, 1983
- Preceded by: Jim Moody
- Succeeded by: Gary K. Johnson
- Constituency: 25th district

Personal details
- Born: June 10, 1947 (age 79) Milwaukee, Wisconsin, U.S.
- Party: Democratic
- Education: Northwestern University (BA); University of Wisconsin Law School (JD)

Barbara Lynn Ulichny (born June 10, 1947) is an American attorney, women's rights activist, and retired Democratic politician. She was a member of the Wisconsin State Senate for 8 years (1985–1993) after serving six years in the State Assembly, representing northeast Milwaukee County.

== Early life and career ==
Born in Milwaukee, Wisconsin, she graduated from Milwaukee Lutheran High School and went on to Northwestern University in Chicago, where she earned her bachelor's degree in 1969. She worked as a high school teacher in Milwaukee.

== Political career ==
In 1972, she launched her first political campaign, running for Wisconsin State Assembly in the newly drawn 10th Assembly district. She was defeated by Republican Jim Sensenbrenner, who won his third term in the State Assembly.

After the 1972 election, Ulichny continued her work as an activist for women's issues. In 1974, she became the legislative coordinator for the Wisconsin Task Force on Rape, which waged a successful campaign to update Wisconsin's sexual assault laws in the 1975–1976 session of the legislature. Following the successful lobbying campaign, she continued to represent the organization in ongoing advocacy and education, and became the head of the advisory committee for the Sexual Assault Treatment Center of Greater Milwaukee. She was also a delegate to the 1977 national convention for International Women's Year and was appointed to the Wisconsin Governor's Committee on the Status of Women.

In 1978, she made another run for State Assembly, this time running in the 25th Assembly district. The incumbent, Jim Moody, had announced he would not run for reelection in 1978, instead choosing a run for State Senate. The open seat in the heavily Democratic 25th district attracted four Democratic candidates, including Ulichny. Ulichny prevailed in the September primary and did not face a Republican opponent in the general election. She was reelected in 1980 and won election in the redrawn 4th Assembly district in 1982.

In 1984, she ran for Wisconsin State Senate, challenging incumbent Republican Rod Johnston in the 4th Senate district. Ulichny prevailed in the general election, taking 55% of the vote. She served two four-year terms in the State Senate, reelected in 1988 without a Republican opponent.

Ulichny was one of several state politicians caught up in an ethics scandal in 1989, involving receipt of improper lobbyist gifts. For her part, Ulichny paid a $5,000 fine to settle the case, but later said she regretted agreeing to the settlement. Shortly thereafter, the 1992 court-ordered redistricting of Wisconsin placed her in a different Senate district, the heavily Republican 8th Senate district. Faced with a choice between likely defeat in the 8th district or relocating to another district, in June 1992, Ulichny announced she would not seek reelection.

== Later years ==
Ulichny had, earlier, begun law school; after announcing her resignation, she completed the final credits to earn her J.D. from the University of Wisconsin Law School. Currently, she is the CEO of Ulichny Consulting and Mediation, a firm that provides public affairs and dispute resolution expertise to a number of private and public sector entities.
