= Rod Johnston =

American politician (1937–2018)

Member of the Wisconsin Senate from the 4th district
- In office April 17, 1979 – January 7, 1985
- Preceded by: Jim Sensenbrenner
- Succeeded by: Barbara Ulichny

Member of the Wisconsin State Assembly from the 10th district
- In office September 2, 1975 – April 17, 1979
- Preceded by: Jim Sensenbrenner
- Succeeded by: Betty Jo Nelsen

Personal details
- Born: Rodney Kohler Johnston; September 2, 1937 Milwaukee, Wisconsin
- Died: March 30, 2018 (aged 80) Tybee Island, Georgia
- Party: Republican
- Children: 3, including Kristen Johnston
- Education: United States Naval Academy (B.S.); George Washington University Law School (J.D.)

Military service
- Allegiance: United States
- Branch/service: United States Navy
- Years of service: 1959–1965

Rodney Kohler "Rod" Johnston (September 2, 1937 – March 30, 2018) was an American attorney and Republican politician. He served six years in the Wisconsin State Senate (1979–1985) after four years in the State Assembly (1975–1979), representing suburban North Shore area of Milwaukee County. In 1982, he was the Republican nominee for United States Congress in Wisconsin's 5th congressional district, but was defeated by Jim Moody.

In 1984, Johnston was challenged by Democrat Barbara Ulichny in the 4th Senate district. Ulichny prevailed in the general election, taking 55% of the vote.

== Biography ==
Johnston was born in Milwaukee, Wisconsin. He was educated at Wauwatosa East High School, graduating in 1955. Johnston placed first in the Naval Academy competitive examination from his Wisconsin congressional district in 1955, and was appointed to the United States Naval Academy, graduating in 1959. He then served six years in the United States Navy.

After leaving the service, he enrolled at George Washington University Law School, where he received his J.D. in 1967.

Johnston began his political in career 1968 by finishing second (with 34.58% of the vote) to the eventual winner of the seat, Jim Sensenbrenner, in the Republican primary race for a seat in the Wisconsin Assembly.

Johnston died March 30, 2018, at his home on Tybee Island, Georgia, at the age of 80. He was survived by his three children, Scott, Julie and actress Kristen Johnston.
