= William C. Rauschenberger =

American politician

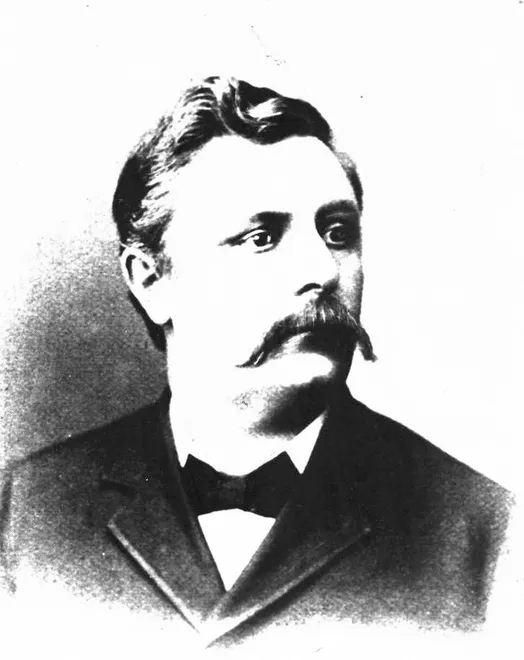

32nd Mayor of Milwaukee
- In office 1896–1898
- Preceded by: John C. Koch
- Succeeded by: David S. Rose

Personal details
- Born: December 6, 1855 Soldin, Prussia
- Died: April 6, 1918 (aged 62)
- Political party: Republican
- Spouse: Ida Anger
- Children: 2

William C. Rauschenberger (December 6, 1855 – April 6, 1918) was a Republican politician who served as mayor of Milwaukee, Wisconsin from 1896 to 1898.

Rauschenberger was born in Soldin, Prussia, to John and Amalie Rauschenberger in 1855; they moved to Wisconsin in 1860. William Rauschenberger held a number of offices in Milwaukee, including alderman, school commissioner, president of the school board, and president of the Common Council. He was elected mayor in 1896 and served a two-year term.

As Common Council President, he dedicated the finished Milwaukee City Hall.

Political offices
Preceded by John C. Koch	Mayor of Milwaukee; 1896–1898	Succeeded by David S. Rose
