= USA Freedom Act =

2015 U.S. surveillance law

- Other short titles: Uniting and Strengthening America by Fulfilling Rights and Ensuring Effective Discipline Over Monitoring Act of 2015
- Long title: An Act To reform the authorities of the Federal Government to require the production of certain business records, conduct electronic surveillance, use pen registers and trap and trace devices, and use other forms of information gathering for foreign intelligence, counterterrorism, and criminal purposes, and for other purposes.
- Acronyms (colloquial): USA FREEDOM Act
- Nicknames: Freedom Act
- Enacted by: the 114th United States Congress

Citations
- Public law: 114-23
- Statutes at Large: 129 Stat. 268 (2015)

Codification
- Acts amended: Foreign Intelligence Surveillance Act of 1978; USA PATRIOT Act; Intelligence Reform and Terrorism Prevention Act; USA PATRIOT Improvement and Reauthorization Act of 2005; National Security Act of 1947; Fair Credit Reporting Act
- U.S.C. sections amended: 12 U.S.C. § 3414, 15 U.S.C. § 1681u, 18 U.S.C. § 2709, 18 U.S.C. § 3511, 50 U.S.C. § 1881a, and others

Legislative history
- Introduced in the House as H.R. 2048 by Jim Sensenbrenner (R-WI) with 150 House and 21 Senate co-sponsors on April 8, 2015; Committee consideration by Judiciary, Permanent Select Committee on Intelligence, Financial Services, United States House Judiciary Subcommittee on Crime, Terrorism, Homeland Security and Investigations; Passed the House on May 13, 2015 (Yeas: 338; Nays: 88); Passed the Senate on June 2, 2015 (Yeas: 67; Nays: 32); Signed into law by President Barack Obama on June 2, 2015

The USA Freedom Act (H.R. 2048, Pub. L. 114–23 (text) (PDF)) is a U.S. law enacted on June 2, 2015, that restored and modified several provisions of the Patriot Act, which had expired the day before. The act imposes some new limits on the bulk collection of telecommunication metadata on U.S. citizens by American intelligence agencies, including the National Security Agency. It also restores authorization for roving wiretaps and tracking lone wolf terrorists. The title of the act is a ten-letter backronym (USA FREEDOM) that stands for Uniting and Strengthening America by Fulfilling Rights and Ensuring Effective Discipline Over Monitoring Act of 2015.

The bill was originally introduced in both houses of the U.S. Congress on October 29, 2013, following publication of classified NSA memos describing bulk data collection programs leaked by Edward Snowden that June. When it was re-introduced in the 114th Congress (2015–2016), it was described by the bill sponsors as "a balanced approach" while being questioned for extending the Patriot Act through the end of 2019. Supporters of the bill said that the House Intelligence Committee and House leadership would insist on reauthorizing all Patriot Act powers except bulk collection under Section 215 of the Patriot Act. Critics assert that mass surveillance of the content of Americans' communication will continue under Section 702 of FISA and Executive Order 12333 due to the "unstoppable surveillance-industrial complex" despite the fact that a bipartisan majority of the House had previously voted to close backdoor mass surveillance.

The USA Freedom Act mandates that the FISA court release "novel" interpretations of the law, which thereby sets precedent and thereby makes up the body of FISA court common law, as both legal authority for deciding subsequent cases, and for guidance parameters for allowing or restricting surveillance conduct. The Act is not clear as to whether or not it mandates retroactive disclosure of decisions prior to passage of the Act in 2015. In October 2016, the ACLU filed a Motion for the Release of FISA Court Records to release interpretations prior to the USA Freedom Act.

== Background ==
Many members of Congress believed that in the wake of the Snowden disclosures, restoration of public trust would require legislative changes. More than 20 bills have been written since the disclosures began with the goal of clarifying government surveillance powers.

Representative Jim Sensenbrenner, who introduced the USA PATRIOT Act (H.R. 3162) in 2001 following the September 11 terrorist attacks to give more power to US intelligence agencies, and who has described himself as "author of the Patriot Act," declared that it was time to put the NSA's "metadata program out of business." With its bulk collection of Americans' phone data, Sensenbrenner asserted that the intelligence community "misused those powers," had gone "far beyond" the original intent of the legislation, and had "overstepped its authority."

== Purpose ==
According to supporters, the USA Freedom Act was meant to end the bulk collection of Americans' metadata by the NSA, end the secret laws created by the FISA court, and introduce a "Special Advocate" to represent public and privacy matters. However, opponents of the bill cite that the USA Freedom Act does allow the bulk collection of Americans' metadata by phone companies, which is then accessible by the NSA; it also does not address other laws which have purportedly challenged Americans' Fourth Amendment rights. Other proposed changes included limits to programs like PRISM, which retains Americans' Internet data, and greater transparency by allowing companies such as Google and Facebook to disclose information about government requests for information.

Representative Jim Sensenbrenner, who introduced the bill, stated that its purpose was:

To rein in the dragnet collection of data by the National Security Agency (NSA) and other government agencies, increase transparency of the Foreign Intelligence Surveillance Court (FISC), provide businesses the ability to release information regarding FISA requests, and create an independent constitutional advocate to argue cases before the FISC.

According to the bill's sponsors, their legislation would have amended Section 215 of the Patriot Act to ensure that any phone records obtained by the government were essential in an investigation that involved terrorism or espionage, thereby ending bulk collection, while preserving "the intelligence community's ability to gather information in a more focused way."

== Provisions and elements of the Act ==
This summary is based largely on the summary provided by the Congressional Research Service, a public domain source.

=== Title I: FISA Business Records ===
Section 101 amends the Foreign Intelligence Surveillance Act of 1978 (FISA) to establish a new process to be followed when the Federal Bureau of Investigation (FBI) submits an application to a FISA court for an order requiring the production of business records or other tangible things for an investigation to obtain foreign intelligence information not concerning a U.S. person or to protect against international terrorism or clandestine intelligence activities.

Prohibits the FBI from applying for a tangible thing production order unless a specific selection term is used as the basis for the production. Maintains limitations under current law that prohibit the FBI from applying for tangible thing production orders for threat assessments.

Establishes two separate frameworks for the production of tangible things with different standards that apply based on whether the FBI's application seeks.

Defines "call detail record" as session identifying information (including an originating or terminating telephone number, an International Mobile Subscriber Identity number, or an International Mobile Station Equipment Identity number), a telephone calling card number, or the time or duration of a call.

Requires the FBI, in applications for ongoing production of call detail records for investigations to protect against international terrorism, to show: (1) reasonable grounds to believe that the call detail records are relevant to such investigation; and (2) a reasonable, articulable suspicion that the specific selection term is associated with a foreign power or an agent of a foreign power engaged in international terrorism or activities in preparation for such terrorism.

Requires a judge approving such an ongoing release of call detail records for an investigation to protect against international terrorism.

Allows a FISA court to approve other categories of FBI requests for the production of call detail records or tangible things (i.e., FBI call detail record and tangible thing applications that do not seek ongoing production of call detail records created before, on, or after the date of an application relating to an authorized investigation to protect against international terrorism) without subjecting the production to: (1) the reasonable, articulable suspicion standard for an association with a foreign power or an agent of a foreign power; (2) the 180-day or the two-hop limitation; or (3) the special minimization procedures that require prompt destruction of produced records only if the order approves an ongoing production of call detail records for investigations to protect against international terrorism.

Section 102 authorizes the Attorney General to require the emergency production of tangible things without first obtaining a court order if the Attorney General: (1) reasonably determines that an emergency situation requires the production of tangible things before an order authorizing production can be obtained with due diligence, (2) reasonably determines that a factual basis exists for the issuance of such a production order, (3) informs a FISA judge of the decision to require such production at the time the emergency decision is made, and (4) makes an application to a FISA judge within seven days after the Attorney General requires such emergency production.

Terminates the authority for such emergency production of tangible things when the information sought is obtained, when the application for the order is denied, or after the expiration of seven days from the time the Attorney General begins requiring such emergency production, whichever is earliest.

Prohibits information obtained or evidence derived from such an emergency production from being received in evidence or disclosed in any proceeding in or before any court, grand jury, agency, legislative committee, or other authority of the United States, any state, or any political subdivision if: (1) the subsequent application for court approval is denied, or (2) the production is terminated and no order is issued approving the production. Bars information concerning any U.S. person acquired from such production from being used or disclosed in any other manner by federal officers or employees without the consent of such person, except with approval of the Attorney General if the information indicates a threat of death or serious bodily harm.

Section 103 requires FISA court orders approving the production of tangible things to include each specific selection term used as the basis for such production. Prohibits FISA courts from authorizing the collection of tangible things without the use of a specific selection term.

Section 104 requires a FISA court, as a condition to approving an application for a tangible thing production order, to find that the minimization procedures submitted with the application meet applicable FISA standards. Authorizes the court to impose additional minimization procedures.

Allows a nondisclosure order imposed in connection with a tangible thing production order to be challenged immediately by filing a petition for judicial review. Removes a requirement that a judge considering a petition to modify or set aside a nondisclosure order treat as conclusive a certification by the Attorney General, the Deputy Attorney General, an Assistant Attorney General, or the FBI Director that disclosure may endanger national security or interfere with diplomatic relations.

Section 105 extends liability protections to persons who provide information, facilities, or technical assistance for the production of tangible things.

Section 106 requires the government to compensate a person for reasonable expenses incurred in producing tangible things or providing technical assistance to the government to implement production procedures.

Section 108 amends the USA PATRIOT Improvement and Reauthorization Act of 2005 to require the Inspector General of the Department of Justice to audit the effectiveness and use of FISA authority to obtain production of tangible things from 2012 to 2014, including an examination of whether minimization procedures adopted by the Attorney General adequately protect the constitutional rights of U.S. persons. Directs the Inspector General of the Intelligence Community, for the same 2012–2014 period, to assess: (1) the importance of such information to the intelligence community; (2) the manner in which such information was collected, retained, analyzed, and disseminated; and (3) the adequacy of minimization procedures, including an assessment of any minimization procedures proposed by an element of the intelligence community that were modified or denied by the court.

Requires such Inspectors General to report to Congress regarding the results of such audit and assessment.

Section 109 requires amendments made by this Act to FISA's tangible thing requirements to take effect 180 days after enactment of this Act. Prohibits this Act from being construed to alter or eliminate the government's authority to obtain an order under the tangible things requirements of FISA as in effect prior to the effective date of such amendments during the period ending on such effective date.

Section 110 prohibits this Act from being construed to authorize the production of the contents of any electronic communication from an electronic communication service provider under such tangible thing requirements.

=== Title II: FISA Pen Register and Trap and Trace Device Reform ===
Section 201 requires the government's FISA applications for orders approving pen registers or trap and trace devices to include a specific selection term as the basis for the use of the register or device. Prohibits broad geographic regions or an identification of an electronic communications service or a remote computing service from serving as such selection term.

Section 202 directs the Attorney General to ensure that appropriate privacy procedures are in place for the collection, retention, and use of nonpublicly available information concerning U.S. persons that is collected through a pen register or trap and trace device installed with FISA court approval.

=== Title III: FISA Acquisitions Targeting Persons Outside the United States Reforms ===
Section 301 limits the government's use of information obtained through an authorization by the Attorney General and the Director of National Intelligence (DNI) to target non-U.S. persons outside the United States if a FISA court later determines that certain targeting or minimization procedures certified to the court are unlawful.

Prohibits information obtained or evidence derived from an acquisition pursuant to a part of a targeting certification or a related minimization procedure that the court has identified as deficient concerning a U.S. person from being received in evidence or otherwise disclosed in any proceeding in or before any court, grand jury, agency, legislative committee, or other authority of the United States, any state, or any political subdivision.

Bars information concerning any U.S. person acquired pursuant to a deficient part of a certification from being used or disclosed subsequently in any other manner by federal officers or employees without the consent of the U.S. person, except with approval of the Attorney General if the information indicates a threat of death or serious bodily harm.

Allows a FISA court, if the government corrects the deficiency, to permit the use or disclosure of information obtained before the date of the correction.

=== Title IV: Foreign Intelligence Surveillance Court Reforms ===
Section 401 directs the presiding judges of the FISA court and the FISA court of review to jointly designate at least five individuals to serve as amicus curiae to assist in the consideration of any application for an order or review that presents a novel or significant interpretation of the law, unless the court finds that such appointment is not appropriate.

Permits FISA courts to appoint an individual or organization to serve as amicus curiae in other instances, including to provide technical expertise. Requires such amicus curiae to provide: (1) legal arguments that advance protection of individual privacy and civil liberties, or (2) other legal arguments or information related to intelligence collection or communications technology.

Allows the FISA court of review to certify a question of law to be reviewed by the Supreme Court. Permits the Supreme Court to appoint FISA amicus curiae or other persons to provide briefings or other assistance upon such a certification.

Section 402 requires the DNI to: (1) conduct a declassification review of each decision, order, or opinion issued by the FISA court or the FISA court of review that includes a significant construction or interpretation of any provision of law, including any novel or significant construction or interpretation of "specific selection term" as defined in this Act; and (2) make such decisions, orders, or opinions publicly available to the greatest extent practicable, subject to permissible redactions.

Authorizes the DNI to waive such review and public availability requirements if: (1) a waiver is necessary to protect the national security of the United States or properly classified intelligence sources or methods, and (2) an unclassified statement prepared by the Attorney General is made publicly available to summarize the significant construction or interpretation of law.

=== Title V: National Security Letter Reform ===
Section 501 amends the federal criminal code, the Right to Financial Privacy Act, and the Fair Credit Reporting Act to require the FBI and other government agencies to use a specific selection term as the basis for national security letters that request information from wire or electronic communication service providers, financial institutions, or consumer reporting agencies. Requires the government to identify: (1) a person, entity, telephone number, or account for requests for telephone toll and transactional records; (2) a customer, entity, or account when requesting financial records for certain intelligence or protective functions; or (3) a consumer or account when requesting consumer reports for counterintelligence or counterterrorism purposes.

Revises standards under which the government can prohibit recipients of national security letters from disclosing to anyone that the government has sought or obtained access to the requested information.

Section 502 directs the Attorney General to adopt procedures for imposed nondisclosure requirements, including requirements under the National Security Act of 1947, to be reviewed at appropriate intervals and terminated if facts no longer support nondisclosure.

Removes a requirement that the court treat as conclusive a certification by the Attorney General, the Deputy Attorney General, an Assistant Attorney General, or the FBI Director that disclosure may endanger U.S. national security or interfere with diplomatic relations.

Section 503 allows national security letter recipients to challenge national security letter requests or nondisclosure requirements under modified procedures for filing a petition for judicial review.

=== Title VI: FISA Transparency and Reporting Requirement ===
Section 601 requires the Attorney General to expand an annual report to Congress regarding tangible thing applications to include a summary of compliance reviews and the total number of: (1) applications made for the daily production of call detail records created before, on, or after the date of an application relating to an authorized investigation to protect against international terrorism; and (2) orders approving such requests.

Directs the Attorney General to report to Congress annually regarding tangible things applications and orders in which the specific selection term does not specifically identify an individual, account, or personal device. Requires the report to indicate whether the court approving such orders has directed additional, particularized minimization procedures beyond those adopted by the Attorney General.

Section 602 Directs the Administrative Office of the U.S. Courts to submit annually to Congress the number of: (1) FISA applications submitted and orders granted, modified, or denied under specified FISA authorities; and (2) appointments of an individual to serve as amicus curiae for FISA courts, including the name of each appointed individual, as well as any findings that such an appointment is not appropriate. Makes the report subject to a declassification review by the Attorney General and the DNI.

Directs the DNI to make available publicly a report that identifies, for the preceding 12-month period, the total number of: (1) FISA court orders issued for electronic surveillance, physical searches, the targeting of persons outside the United States, pen registers and trap and trace devices, call detail records, and other tangible things; and (2) national security letters issued.

Requires the DNI's reports to include the estimated number of: (1) targets of certain FISA orders, (2) search terms and queries concerning U.S. persons when the government retrieves information from electronic or wire communications obtained by targeting non-U.S. persons outside the United States, (3) unique identifiers used to communicate certain collected information, and (4) search terms concerning U.S. persons used to query a database of call detail records. Exempts certain queries by the FBI from such estimates.

Section 603 permits a person who is subject to a nondisclosure requirement accompanying a FISA order, directive, or national security letter to choose one of four methods to report publicly, on a semiannual or annual basis, the aggregate number of orders, directives, or letters with which the person was required to comply. Specifies the categories of orders, directives, and letters to be itemized or combined, the details authorized to be included with respect to contents or noncontents orders and the number of customer selectors targeted, and the ranges within which the number of orders, directives, or letters received may be reported aggregately in bands under each permitted method (i.e., reported in bands of 1000, 500, 250, or 100 depending on the chosen method).

Requires the information that may be included in certain aggregates to be delayed by 180 days, one year, or 540 days depending on the chosen reporting method and whether the nondisclosure requirements are contained in a new order or directive concerning a platform, product, or service for which the person did not previously receive an order or directive.

Section 604 expands the categories of FISA court decisions, orders, or opinions that the Attorney General is required to submit to Congress within 45 days after issuance of the decision to include: (1) a denial or modification of an application under FISA; and (2) a change of the application, or a novel application, of any FISA provision. (Currently i.e. as of May 13, 2015, the Attorney General is only required to submit only decisions regarding a significant construction or interpretation of any FISA provision.)

Section 605 revises reporting requirements regarding electronic surveillance, physical searches, and tangible things to include the House Judiciary Committee as a recipient of such reports.

Requires the Attorney General to identify in an existing semiannual report each agency on behalf of which the government has applied for orders authorizing or approving the installation and use of pen registers or trap and trace devices under FISA.

=== Title VII: Enhanced National Security Provisions ===
Section 701 establishes procedures for a lawfully authorized targeting of a non-U.S. person previously believed to be located outside the United States to continue for a period not to exceed 72 hours from the time that the non-U.S. person is reasonably believed to be located inside the United States. Requires an element of the intelligence community, as a condition to exercising such authority, to: (1) determine that a lapse in the targeting poses a threat of death or serious bodily harm; (2) notify the Attorney General; and (3) request, as soon as practicable, the employment of emergency electronic surveillance or emergency physical search under appropriate FISA standards.

Section 702 expands the definition of "agent of a foreign power" to include a non-U.S. person who: (1) acts in the United States for or on behalf of a foreign power engaged in clandestine intelligence activities in the United States contrary to U.S. interests or as an officer, employee, or member of a foreign power, irrespective of whether the person is inside the United States; or (2) knowingly aids, abets, or conspires with any person engaging in an international proliferation of weapons of mass destruction on behalf of a foreign power or conducting activities in preparation for such proliferation.

Section 704 Increases from 15 to 20 years the maximum penalty of imprisonment for providing material support or resources to a foreign terrorist organization in cases where the support does not result in the death of any person.

Section 705 amends the USA PATRIOT Improvement and Reauthorization Act of 2005 and the Intelligence Reform and Terrorism Prevention Act of 2004 to extend until December 15, 2019, FISA authorities concerning: (1) the production of business records, including call detail records and other tangible things; (2) roving electronic surveillance orders; and (3) a revised definition of "agent of a foreign power" that includes any non-U.S. persons who engage in international terrorism or preparatory activities (commonly referred to as the "lone wolf" provision). (Currently i.e. as of May 13, 2015, such provisions are scheduled to expire on June 1, 2015.)

=== Title VIII: Safety of Maritime Navigation and Nuclear Terrorism Conventions Implementation ===
==== Subtitle A: Safety of Maritime Navigation ====
Section 801 amends the federal criminal code to provide that existing prohibitions against conduct that endangers the safe navigation of a ship: (1) shall apply to conduct that is committed against or on board a U.S. vessel or a vessel subject to U.S. jurisdiction, in U.S. territorial seas, or by a U.S. corporation or legal entity; and (2) shall not apply to activities of armed forces during an armed conflict or in the exercise of official duties.

Sets forth procedures regarding the delivery of a person who is suspected of committing a maritime navigation or fixed platform offense to the authorities of a country that is a party to the Convention for the Suppression of Unlawful Acts against the Safety of Maritime Navigation.

Subjects property used or intended to be used to commit or to facilitate the commission of a maritime navigation offense to civil forfeiture.

Section 802 prohibits: (1) using in or on a ship or a maritime fixed platform any explosive or radioactive material, biological, chemical, or nuclear weapon, or other nuclear explosive device in a manner likely to cause death or serious injury or damage when the purpose is to intimidate a population or to compel a government or international organization to act or abstain from acting; (2) transporting on board a ship such material or device (or certain related material or technology) that is intended for such use, with specified exceptions; (3) transporting on board a ship a person known to have committed a maritime navigation offense intending to assist such person to evade prosecution; (4) injuring or killing any person in connection with such an offense; or (5) conspiring, attempting, or threatening to commit such an offense. Sets forth: (1) the circumstances in which the United States can exercise jurisdiction over such offenses, and (2) exceptions applicable to activities of the armed forces. Provides for civil forfeiture of property used to commit or to facilitate a violation.

Section 805 includes offenses involving violence against maritime navigation and maritime transport involving weapons of mass destruction within the definition of "federal crime of terrorism."

==== Subtitle B: Prevention of Nuclear Terrorism ====
Section 811 prohibits anyone, knowingly, unlawfully, and with intent to cause death, serious bodily injury, or substantial damage to property or the environment, from: (1) possessing radioactive material or making or possessing a nuclear explosive device or a radioactive material dispersal or radiation-emitting device; (2) using radioactive material or a device, using, damaging, or interfering with the operation of a nuclear facility in a manner that causes or increases the risk of the release of radioactive material, or causing radioactive contamination or exposure to radiation; or (3) threatening, attempting, or conspiring to commit such an offense. Sets forth: (1) the circumstances in which the United States can exercise jurisdiction over such offenses, and (2) exceptions applicable to activities of the armed forces.

Includes such offenses within the definition of "federal crime of terrorism."

Section 812 amends provisions prohibiting transactions involving nuclear materials to: (1) prohibit, intentionally and without lawful authority, carrying, sending, or moving nuclear material into or out of a country; and (2) establish an exception for activities of the armed forces.

== Passing the bill ==
=== 113th Congress (2013–14) ===
The House version, introduced by Representative Jim Sensenbrenner as HR 3361, was referred to the United States House Judiciary Subcommittee on Crime, Terrorism, Homeland Security and Investigations January 9, 2014, and the Senate version, introduced by Senator Patrick Leahy, was read twice and referred to the Senate Committee on the Judiciary. An amended version out of the House Judiciary Committee contained many provisions raising concerns among civil libertarians including an extension of the controversial USA PATRIOT Act through the end of 2017. After considering the bill throughout 2014, the Senate voted on November 18, 2014, to end further discussion of the measure during the 113th United States Congress.

The bill comprised several provisions: FISA business records reforms, FISA pen register and trap and trace device reforms, FISA acquisitions targeting persons outside the United States reforms, Foreign Intelligence Surveillance Court reforms, Office of the Special Advocate, National Security Letter reforms, FISA and National Security Letter transparency reforms, and Privacy and Civil Liberties Oversight Board subpoena authority.

==== Markup in House Judiciary Committee ====
In May 2014, the U.S. House Judiciary Committee posted a "Manager's Amendment" on its website. Title VII of the Amendment read "Section 102(b)(1) of the USA Patriot Improvement and Reauthorization Act of 2005 (50 U.S.C. 1805 note) is amended by striking "June 1, 2015" and inserting "December 31, 2017," extending the controversial USA PATRIOT Act through the end of 2017.

The National Journal wrote "one tech lobbyist noted concern that a provision that would have allowed companies to disclose to customers more information about government data requests has been dropped. In addition, an external special advocate that would oversee the Foreign Intelligence Surveillance Court would no longer be selected by the Privacy and Civil Liberties Oversight Board. Instead, the court's judges would designate five 'amicus curiae' who possess appropriate security clearances."

The Electronic Frontier Foundation (EFF) stated it remained "concerned that this bill omits important transparency provisions found in the (original 2013) USA FREEDOM Act, which are necessary to shed light on surveillance abuses." In addition, the EFF said it believed "this bill should do more to address mass surveillance under Section 702 of Foreign Intelligence Surveillance Amendments Act, a section of law used to collect the communications of users worldwide." The Open Technology Institute commented "several other key reforms—such as provisions allowing Internet and phone companies to publish more information about the demands they receive, which OTI and a coalition of companies and organizations have been pressing for since last summer—have been removed, while the bill also provides for a new type of court order that the President has requested, allowing for continuous collection by the government of specified telephone records".

Despite the criticism from civil liberties groups, Mike Rogers, a defender of the NSA's surveillance practices and the chairman of the House Intelligence Committee, praised the amendments. Rogers, who had his own bill which would codify the NSA's surveillance practices in to law, called the proposed amendments a "huge improvement." Foreign Policy wrote "any compromise to the Judiciary bill risks an insurrection from civil libertarians in Congress. Michigan Republican Justin Amash led such a revolt last year when he offered an NSA amendment to a defense appropriations bill that would have stripped funding for the NSA's collection program." "Just a weakened bill or worse than status quo? I'll find out," Representative Amash said.

After the marked up bill passed the House Judiciary Committee USA Freedom Act co-author and Senate Committee on the Judiciary Chairman Patrick Leahy commented that he "remain concerned that the legislation approved today does not include some of the important reforms related to national security letters, a strong special advocate at the FISA Court, and greater transparency. I will continue to push for those reforms when the Senate Judiciary Committee considers the USA Freedom Act this summer."

==== Passage in House of Representatives ====
The House of Representatives passed on May 22, 2014 the USA Freedom act by 303 votes to 121. Because the House version was weakened by lawmakers loyal to the intelligence establishment it lost support of important House Judiciary members like Republicans Darrell Issa, Ted Poe and Raul Labrador and Democrat Zoe Lofgren who previously voted for the act. "The result is a bill that will actually not end bulk collection, regrettably," said Rep. Zoe Lofgren who voted against the bill. The act would shift responsibility for retaining telephonic metadata from the government to telephone companies. Providers like AT&T and Verizon would be required to maintain the records and let the NSA search them in terrorism investigations when the agency obtains a judicial order or in certain emergency situations. The USA Freedom Act demands that the NSA get approval for a search from the Foreign Intelligence Surveillance Court before demanding that the telecoms hand over metadata. However, no "probable-cause" Fourth Amendment standard is required to access the database. While an allowable search under the original USA Freedom Act was defined as "a term used to uniquely describe a person, entity, or account", but under the House version a database search inquiry is now allowed if it is "a discrete term, such as a term specifically identifying a person, entity, account, address, or device." Provisions that were dropped from the bill included requirements to estimate the number of Americans whose records were captured under the program, and the creation of a public advocate to challenge the government's legal arguments before the Foreign Intelligence Surveillance Court.

The passed House version was criticised by U.S. senators, tech firms like Google, Apple, Microsoft, Facebook and Twitter, as well as civil liberties groups. Major U.S. tech firms like Google, Apple, Microsoft, Facebook, and Twitter joined together in the Reform Government Surveillance coalition which called the House version a move in the wrong direction. The Reform Government Surveillance released a statement on June 5, stating: "The latest draft opens up an unacceptable loophole that could enable the bulk collection of Internet users' data ... While it makes important progress, we cannot support this bill as currently drafted and urge Congress to close this loophole to ensure meaningful reform." Zeke Johnson, director of Amnesty International USA's security and human rights program, accusing the House for failing to deliver serious surveillance reform said: "People inside and outside the U.S. would remain at risk of dragnet surveillance. The Senate should pass much stronger reforms ensuring greater transparency, robust judicial review, equal rights for non-U.S. persons, and a clear, unambiguous ban on mass spying. President Obama need not wait. He can and should implement such safeguards today." The White House however endorsed the bill. "The Administration strongly supports House passage of H.R. 3361, the USA Freedom Act. ... The Administration applauds and appreciates the strong bipartisan effort that led to the formulation of this bill, which heeds the President's call on this important issue," the White House said in a statement. "The bill ensures our intelligence and law enforcement professionals have the authorities they need to protect the Nation, while further ensuring that individuals' privacy is appropriately protected when these authorities are employed. Among other provisions, the bill prohibits bulk collection through the use of Section 215, FISA pen registers, and National Security Letters."

Civil rights groups and scholars said the new language allowing the NSA to search meta data handed over from telephone companies was vague and perhaps would allow the NSA to ensnare the metadata of broad swaths of innocent people in violation of their constitutional rights. "In particular, while the previous bill would have required any request for records to be tied to a clearly defined set of 'specific selection terms,' the bill that just passed leaves the definition of 'specific selection terms' open. This could allow for an overly broad and creative interpretation, which is something we've certainly seen from the executive branch and the FISA Court before," said Elizabeth Goitein, a co-director of the Brennan Center's Liberty and National Security Program. "The new definition is incredibly more expansive than previous definitions ... The new version not only adds the undefined words "address" and "device," but makes the list of potential selection terms open-ended by using the term "such as." Congress has been clear that it wishes to end bulk collection, but given the government's history of twisted legal interpretations, this language can't be relied on to protect our freedoms," said the Electronic Frontier Foundation in a press release.

==== Defeat in the Senate ====
Negotiations among intelligence agencies, the White House, lawmakers and their aides, and privacy advocates in the summer of 2014 led to a modified bill (S. S.2685) in the U.S. Senate. This bill version addressed most privacy concerns regarding the NSA program that collects records of Americans' phone calls in bulk.

Under the bill the NSA would no longer collect those phone records. Instead, most of the records would have stayed in the hands of the phone companies, which would not have been required to hold them any longer than they already do for normal business purposes, which in some cases is 18 months. The bill would require the NSA to request specific data from phone companies under specified limits i.e. the NSA would need to show it had reasonable, articulable suspicion that the number it is interested in is tied to a foreign terrorist organization or individual. The proposed legislation would still have allowed analysts to perform so-called contact chaining in which they trace a suspect's network of acquaintances, but they would have been required to use a new kind of court order to swiftly obtain only those records that were linked, up to two layers away, to a suspect — even when held by different phone companies. It would also require the federal surveillance court to appoint a panel of public advocates to advance legal positions in support of privacy and civil liberties, and would expand company reporting to the public on the scope of government requests for customers' data. This USA Freedom Act version thus gained the support of the Obama Administration, including the director of national intelligence and attorney general, as well as many tech companies including Apple, Google, Microsoft and Yahoo as well as a diverse range of groups, including the National Rifle Association and the American Civil Liberties Union.

Following the 2014 Congressional elections, the Senate voted on November 18, 2014, to block further debate of the measure during the 113th United States Congress. Fifty-four Democrats and four Republicans who supported consideration failed to muster the 60 votes required. Senator Patrick Leahy, who drafted the bill, blamed its defeat on what he called fear-mongering by opponents, saying, "Fomenting fear stifles serious debate and constructive solutions." Senator Mitch McConnell, the Republican leader, argued that the NSA's bulk collection of Americans' metadata was a vital tool in the fight against terrorism. "This is the worst possible time to be tying our hands behind our backs," he said.

=== 114th Congress (2015–16) ===
The USA Freedom Act was re-introduced in the House Judiciary Committee and Senate Judiciary Committee in late April 2015 based upon a modified version of the one which failed in the Senate in the 113th Congress.

The 2015 USA Freedom Act version is described by its sponsors as "a balanced approach that would ensure the NSA maintains an ability to obtain the data it needs to detect terrorist plots without infringing on Americans' right to privacy." Human rights groups believed the bill's transparency and court oversight provisions are less robust than would have been required in a previous version of the bill, with more limited reporting requirements and a more narrowly defined role for external court advocates.

==== Passage out of House Judiciary Committee ====
The bill passed out of the House Judiciary Committee on April 30, 2015. The proposed bill would end the NSA's bulk collection under Section 215 by requiring the government to seek records from companies using a "specific selection term" that identifies a specific person, account or address and "is used to limit ... the scope" of records sought. The term may not be a phone or Internet company.

==== House Passage ====
The USA Freedom Act passed the U.S. House of Representatives on May 13, 2015. With 338 votes for and 88 against it was passed without any amendments to the House Judiciary version because the House Rules Committee prohibited consideration of any amendment to the USA Freedom Act, claiming that any changes to the legislation would have weakened its chances of passage. The bill had the support of the White House, Attorney General Eric Holder and Director of National Intelligence James Clapper. While civil liberties groups were divided over the support of the bill, lawmakers opposed to the Bill stated it will handicap the NSA and allow terrorist groups to prosper.

==== Passage in Senate ====
The USA Freedom Act was not passed by the U.S. Senate on May 22, 2015. By a vote of 57–42, the Senate did not pass the bill that would have required 60 votes to move forward, which meant that the NSA had to start winding down its domestic mass surveillance program. The Senate also rejected, by 54–45, also short of the necessary 60 votes, a two-month extension for the key provision in the Patriot Act that has been used to justify NSA spying, which was set to expire on June 1, 2015.

However, on May 31, 2015, the Senate voted 77–17 to limit debate on the act. Senate rules will allow it to be passed after the mass surveillance programs have expired. While several amendments which would strengthen the bill were not allowed to be considered, three amendments proposed by chair of the Senate Intelligence Committee Richard Burr to weaken the bill, considered "poison pills," were allowed to be considered but ultimately rejected.

The bill ultimately passed the Senate 67–32 on June 2, 2015 and reinstated three lapsed authorities i.e. the "Section 215" authority, the "lone wolf" authority and the "roving wiretaps" authority of the Patriot Act, while reforming the "Section 215" authority. President Obama signed the legislation on the sixth day.

=== National security and trade groups ===
The Center for National Security supports the USA Freedom Act introduced on April 28, 2015 to end bulk collection of Americans' telephone metadata under the so-called "section 215" program.

The Software Alliance sponsored the legislation saying "in reforming government surveillance practices, it is critical that legislation strikes the right balance between securing our nation and its citizens and improving privacy protections for the public. The FISA reforms in the USA FREEDOM Act will help restore trust in both the US government and the US technology sector."

The ITIC said "the USA Freedom Act, H.R. 2048, builds on the foundation laid by the House Judiciary Committee last Congress and the result is a bill that strengthens privacy protections while maintaining the interests of national security."

=== Civil liberties advocates ===
The final USA Freedom Act is perceived as containing several concessions to pro-surveillance legislators meant to facilitate its passage. The watered down version of the USA Freedom Act that passed the House of Representatives in 2015 has been widely criticized by civil liberties advocates and its original supporters amongst house members for extending the Patriot Act Mass surveillance programs without meaningful restraints, undermining the original purpose of the bill.

"This bill would make only incremental improvements, and at least one provision—the material-support provision—would represent a significant step backwards," ACLU deputy legal director Jameel Jaffer said in a statement. "The disclosures of the last two years make clear that we need wholesale reform." Jaffer wants Congress to let Section 215 sunset completely and wait for a better reform package than endorse something half-baked, saying that "unless that bill is strengthened, sunset would be the better course." The ACLU had previously written of the 2013 version that "although the USA Freedom Act does not fix every problem with the government's surveillance authorities and programs, it is an important first step and it deserves broad support."

Representative Justin Amash, author of the narrowly defeated Amash–Conyers Amendment, a proposal that would have de-funded the NSA bulk-collection program, backed the 2013 legislation, but not the final 2015 version. "It's getting out of control," he commented. "[Courts are issuing] general warrants without specific cause ... and you have one agency that's essentially having superpowers to pass information onto others".

According to Deputy Attorney General James Cole, even if the Freedom Act becomes law, the NSA could continue its bulk collection of American's phone records. He explained that "it's going to depend on how the [FISA] court interprets any number of the provisions" contained within the legislation. Jennifer Granick, Director of Civil Liberties at Stanford Law School, stated:

The Administration and the intelligence community believe they can do whatever they want, regardless of the laws Congress passes, so long they can convince one of the judges appointed to the secretive Foreign Intelligence Surveillance Court (FISC) to agree. This isn't the rule of law. This is a coup d'etat.

International human rights groups remain somewhat skeptical of specific provisions of the bill. For example, Human Rights Watch expressed its concern that the "bill would do little to increase protections for the right to privacy for people outside the United States, a key problem that plagues U.S. surveillance activities. Nor would the bill address mass surveillance or bulk collection practices that may be occurring under other laws or regulations, such as Section 702 of the FISA Amendments Act or Executive Order 12333. These practices affect many more people and include the collection of the actual content of internet communications and phone calls, not just metadata". Zeke Johnson, Director of Amnesty International's Security and Human Rights Program, agreed that "any proposal that fails to ban mass surveillance, end blanket secrecy, or stop discrimination against people outside the U.S. will be a false fix".

Members of the anti-surveillance Civil Liberties Coalition are dismissing the USA Freedom Act in support of the Surveillance State Repeal Act, a far more comprehensive piece of legislation in the House that completely repeals the Patriot Act, as well as 2008's FISA Amendments Act. A group of 60 organizations called Congress to not stop at ending the NSA's bulk collection of telephone information under the USA PATRIOT Act, but to also end the FISA Amendments Act and Executive Order 12333 mass surveillance programs and restore accountability for bad actors in the Intelligence Community.

The Center for Democracy and Technology endorses the bill, but it points out that it doesn't limit data retention for information collected on people who turn out to have no connection to a suspect or target, and emphasizes that this is not an omnibus solution. The group argued the bill had to be supported because "the Senate will weaken the USA FREEDOM Act right before the sunset deadline, forcing the House to accept a weaker bill".

David Segal, executive director of Demand Progress, wants Section 215 to expire. "This bill purports to ban certain acts under narrow authorities, but it doesn't ban those behaviors outright. Nor does it increase meaningful oversight of the NSA" he stated. The group said "a vote for a bill that does not end mass surveillance is a vote in support of mass surveillance." In a statement posted to Demand Progress' website, Segal writes, "The Senate just voted to reinstitute certain lapsed surveillance authorities – and that means that USA Freedom actually made Americans less free." However, he notes the group "[takes] some solace" in the fact that "Section 215 was – ever so briefly – allowed to sunset."

"Companies are provided monetary incentive to spy and share that information with the government and blanket liability once they do under USA Freedom – even if that breaks that law," said Sascha Meinrath, the director of X-lab, an independent tech policy institute previously associated with New America. "Once companies receive that, they'll have almost no reason to weigh in on meaningful surveillance reform." "In a way, it's kind of like PRISM," the program revealed by Snowden where major tech companies turned over the content of online communications to the NSA, said longtime independent surveillance researcher Marcy Wheeler. "It pushes things to providers: Everyone gets immunity, but it doesn't add to the privacy."

"We think of the USA Freedom Act as yesterday's news," said Shahid Buttar of the Bill of Rights Defense Committee, "and we're interested in forcing the [intelligence] agencies into a future where they comply with constitutional limits." "If passed, it'll be the only step," predicted Patrick Eddington of the Cato Institute, a former House staffer, since the next expiration date for a major piece of surveillance legislation is 31 December 2017.

Following the law's passage on June 2, 2015, ACLU deputy legal director Jameel Jaffer retracted his earlier criticism and claimed that "This is the most important surveillance reform bill since 1978, and its passage is an indication that Americans are no longer willing to give the intelligence agencies a blank check."

=== Proposed Reauthorization ===
On August 14, 2019, the outgoing Director of National Intelligence sent a letter to Congress stating the Trump Administration's intention to seek permanent extension of the provisions of FISA that under the terms of the USA FREEDOM Act are scheduled to expire on December 15, 2019, namely the "lone wolf" authority allowing surveillance of a suspected terrorist who is inspired by foreign ideology but is not acting at the direction of a foreign party, the roving wiretap authority regarding surveillance of a terrorist who enters the United States and the authority to allow the Federal Bureau of Investigation to obtain certain business records in a national security investigation, as well as the call detail records program undertaken by the NSA. In reference to the latter authority, the letter announced that "The National Security Agency has suspended the call detail records program that uses this authority and deleted the call detail records acquired under this authority."

Jurisdiction over the reauthorization of the expiring FISA provisions is shared by the Judiciary and Intelligence committees in the U.S. Senate and the U.S. House of Representatives; the House Committee on the Judiciary and the Senate Committee on the Judiciary held separate public hearings on the reauthorization in September 2019 and November 2019, respectively. Opposition to the call detail records program has led to some Congressional demands that the authority for the program not be renewed. Additional complications hindering reauthorization arose from a report of the US Department of Justice Inspector General finding fault with certain FISA applications in connection with the 2016 presidential campaign, which led some members of Congress to insist on reforms to FISA as a condition of reauthorizing the expiring USA FREEDOM Act provisions. With Congressional attention focused on dealing with the COVID-19 pandemic in the United States in 2020, the House of Representatives passed a long-term extension of the USA FREEDOM Act on March 11, 2020, just four days before the scheduled expiration of the Act on March 15, 2020, by a wide, bipartisan margin that kept the protections of the Act largely the same. Two months later, the Senate passed an extension of the Act by an 80-16 vote that expanded some privacy protections, but the Senate version did not include protection of Americans’ internet browsing and search histories from warrantless surveillance, which was proposed by Sens. Ron Wyden (D-OR) and Steve Daines (R-MT) and failed by one vote. The House is expected to take up the Senate version of the extension, and some House members have signaled they will attempt to revive the Daines-Wyden amendment in the House.

== See also ==
- US person § Data collection and intelligence
- The Day We Fight Back
- FISA Improvements Act
- List of bills in the 113th United States Congress
