= Controversial invocations of the Patriot Act =

Issue in American criminal law

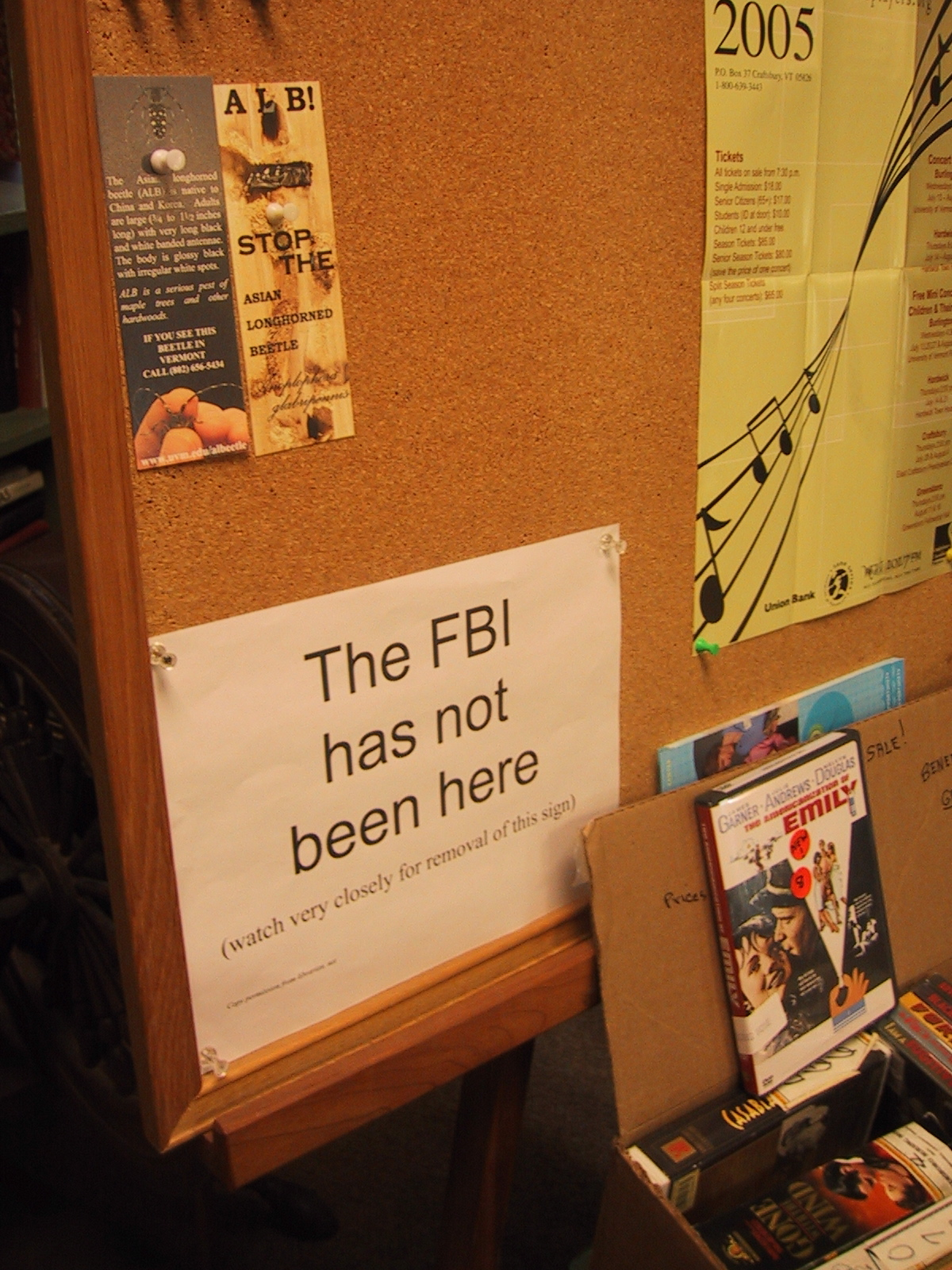
A "warrant canary" on display at a public library in Vermont in 2005, highlighting the FBI's powers to demand sweeping information from libraries under the Patriot Act.

The following are controversial invocations of the USA PATRIOT Act. The stated purpose of the Act is to "deter and punish terrorist acts in the United States and around the world, to enhance law enforcement investigatory tools, and for other purposes." One criticism of the Act is that "other purposes" often includes the detection and prosecution of non-terrorist alleged future crimes.

== Dismissal of United States Attorneys ==
2006 dismissal of U.S. attorneys controversy
- Timeline
- Summary of attorneys
- Congressional hearings
- List of dismissed attorneys
- All related articles

Seven United States Attorneys were dismissed by the United States Department of Justice on December 7, 2006. Senior members of the White House and the Department of Justice participated in compiling the list of those to be dismissed. The USA Patriot Act Improvement and Reauthorization Act of 2005, which was signed into law on March 9, 2006, extinguished the former 120-day term limit of interim United States Attorneys appointed to fill vacated offices. This in effect gave the U.S. Attorney General greater appointing authority than the president, since the interim U.S. attorneys did not need Senate confirmation, and the presidential nominees do. (An interim U.S. attorney's term expires upon the confirmation and swearing in of a presidentially appointed U.S. attorney, if one is put forward.) Critics have claimed the dismissals were either motivated by desire to install attorneys more loyal to the Republican party or as retribution for actions or inactions damaging to the Republican party. At least six of the eight had positive internal Justice Department performance reports.

A bill, S-214, filed in January 2007, to rescind the no-term-limit interim U.S. attorney provision was approved by very large majorities in both the Senate and the House, and was signed into law by the President on June 14, 2007, designated Public Law No: 110-34 and called the Preserving United States Attorney Independence Act of 2007. The new law also specifies that all Attorney General-appointed interim attorneys then in office shall have a term that ends 120 days from the signing of the bill. As of June 14, 2007, the Department of Justice has more than twenty United States attorney positions that are not presidential appointees, which are filled by either acting US attorneys (held by civil service first U.S. attorneys) or interim U.S. attorneys appointed by the Attorney general. (Terms of district court-appointed interim US attorneys were unaffected by the new law—there was at least one: Paula D. Silsby of Maine, appointed in 2001.)

== Investigating copyright infringement ==
Adam McGaughey, the webmaster of a fan site for the television show Stargate SG-1, was charged with copyright infringement and computer fraud. During the investigation, the FBI invoked a provision of the Act to obtain financial records from the site's Internet Service Provider. The USA PATRIOT Act amended the Computer Fraud and Abuse Act to include search and seizure of records from Internet Service Providers.

== Investigation of potential drug traffickers ==
In September 2003, The New York Times reported on a case of the USA PATRIOT Act being used to investigate alleged potential drug traffickers without probable cause. The article also mentions a study by Congress that referenced hundreds of cases where the USA PATRIOT Act was used to investigate non-terrorist alleged future crimes. The New York Times reports that these non-terrorist investigations are relevant because President Bush and several members of Congress stated that the purpose the USA PATRIOT Act was that of investigating and preempting potential terrorist acts.

This is also seen by some as a violation of constitutional rights as Defined in Article One of the United States Constitution which states, "No bill of attainder or ex post facto Law shall be passed." Prohibiting a bill of attainder means that the US Congress cannot pass a law which deems a specific person or group guilty and then punish them without trial. Prohibiting an ex post facto law (Latin - literally - after the fact) means that the US Congress cannot make any given act a crime (or a more serious crime) after the time when that act has been committed. It is arguable that this applies to some uses of the Patriot Act and those who watch the Supreme Court are waiting for a case to make its way up so that the judges can rule on it.

== Blanket requests for financial, library, and other information on visitors to Las Vegas ==
In November 2005, Business Week reported that the FBI had issued tens of thousands of "national security letters" and had obtained one million financial records from the customers of targeted Las Vegas businesses. Selected businesses included casinos, storage warehouses and car rental agencies. An anonymous Justice official claimed that such requests were permitted under section 215 of the USA PATRIOT Act and despite the volume of requests insisted "We are not inclined to ask courts to endorse fishing expeditions". This didn't just include financial records, but credit records, employment records, and in some cases, health records.

Furthermore, this information is databased and maintained indefinitely by the FBI. Previous legislation required that federal law enforcement destroy any records harvested during an investigation that pertained to anyone deemed innocent. The Patriot Act superseded that and now the records are maintained indefinitely. According to the legislation, they may be "shared with third parties where appropriate" yet nowhere in the legislation does it define who these third parties are or what conditions would be deemed appropriate for the sharing of such records.

The large scale wiretapping and tracing of calls to and from foreign countries also falls under this. Millions of phone records were harvested, fed into a database and were searched for patterns of calling to and from numbers of known terrorists. To date, there have been no announced arrests from this program.

Public libraries have been asked to turn over their records for specific terminals. A few have filed suit, because the National Security Letters that they were presented with were very sweeping, demanding information not just on the individual under investigation, but on everyone who had used specific terminals at the libraries during given time windows. Since many of the users in one case were minor children, one library felt that it had an obligation to notify the parents. The FBI has disagreed and the case is now working its way through the court system.

In June 2005, the United States House of Representatives voted to repeal the Patriot Act provision that had allowed federal agents to examine people's book-reading habits at public libraries and bookstores as part of terrorism investigations.

A National Security Letter can be issued by any FBI agent with the rank of Field Supervisor or above, at their discretion. It does not require a judge or probable cause, as does a search warrant.

== Wrongful accusations under the Act ==
In May 2004, Professor Steve Kurtz of the University at Buffalo reported his wife's death of heart failure. The associate art professor, who works in the biotechnology sector, was using benign bacterial cultures and biological equipment in his work. Police arriving at the scene found the equipment (which had been displayed in museums and galleries throughout Europe and North America) suspicious and notified the Federal Bureau of Investigation (FBI). The next day the FBI, Joint Terrorism Task Force, Department of Homeland Security and numerous other law enforcement agencies arrived in HAZMAT gear and cordoned off the block surrounding Kurtz's house, impounding computers, manuscripts, books, and equipment, and detaining Kurtz without charge for 22 hours; the Erie County Health Department condemned the house as a possible "health risk" while the cultures were analyzed. Although it was determined that nothing in the Kurtz's home posed any health or safety risk, the Justice Department sought charges under Section 175 of the US Biological Weapons Anti-Terrorism Act—a law which was expanded by the USA PATRIOT Act. A grand jury rejected those charges, but Kurtz was still charged with federal criminal mail and wire fraud, and faced 20 years in jail before the charges were dropped. Supporters worldwide argue that this is a politically motivated prosecution, akin to those seen during the era of McCarthyism, and legal observers note that it is a precedent-setting case with far-reaching implications involving the criminalization of free speech and expression for artists, scientists, researchers, and others.

FBI agents used a USA PATRIOT Act "sneak and peek" search to secretly examine the home of Brandon Mayfield, who was wrongfully jailed for two weeks on suspicion of involvement in the Madrid train bombings. Agents seized three hard drives and ten DNA samples preserved on cotton swabs, and took 335 photos of personal items. Mayfield has filed a lawsuit against the U.S. government, contending that his rights were violated by his arrest and by the investigation against him. He also contends the USA PATRIOT Act is unconstitutional.

== Controversial requests to the media ==
The FBI used the USA PATRIOT Act 13 times to request journalists that had interviewed computer intruder Adrian Lamo to preserve their notes and other information while they petitioned the Department of Justice for a subpoena to force the reporters to hand over the information. Journalists involved included newspaper writers, wire service reporters, and MSNBC writers. The Department of Justice did not authorize the subpoena requests because the language of the subpoena violated the Department's guidelines for a subpoena request, rather than recognition of any reporter/source privilege. The requests to preserve information were dropped. In some cases, the FBI apologized for the language of the request.

== Other cases ==
In April 2003, Sami Omar Al-Hussayen was arrested on charges of supporting terrorism by maintaining several web sites that supported violent activities. This crime was created by the 1996 Antiterrorism and Effective Death Penalty Act signed by President Clinton, but was further expanded under the USA PATRIOT Act. Supporters of the Act respond that prosecutors did not try Mr. Al-Hussayen because of his association with the website, but because he actively participated in raising money for terrorist organizations, recruiting terrorists, and disseminating inflammatory rhetoric via his website. Prosecutors said the sites included religious edicts justifying suicide bombings and an invitation to contribute financially to the militant Palestinian organization Hamas.

On the other hand, sometimes critics of the law mistake unrelated prosecution as being under the USA PATRIOT Act. Sherman Austin, anarchist and webmaster of Raise the Fist, plead guilty to violating 18 U.S.C. § 842(p), a 1997 statute authored by California Democratic Senator Dianne Feinstein which prohibits the distribution of bombmaking information knowing or intending that the information will be used in a violent federal crime. Despite claims to the contrary, the USA PATRIOT Act was not invoked in this case.

On October 24, 2005, David Sobel of the Electronic Privacy Information Center (EPIC) obtained FBI Papers under the Freedom of Information Act that revealed that the FBI had been conducting surveillance on citizens for lengthy periods of time without correct paperwork. A total of 13 cases from 2002 to 2004 were referred to the President's Foreign Intelligence Advisory Board's Intelligence Oversight Board.

== Lawsuits ==
=== Klayman v. Obama ===
Ongoing news reports in the international media have revealed operational details about the United States' National Security Agency (NSA) and its international partners' global surveillance of foreign nationals and American citizens. The reports emanate from a cache of top secret documents leaked by the former NSA contractor Edward Snowden. On June 6, 2013, the first of Snowden's documents were published simultaneously by The Washington Post and The Guardian, attracting considerable public attention. Shortly after the disclosure, plaintiffs Larry Klayman, founder of Freedom Watch, Charles Strange and Mary Strange, parents of Michael Strange, a cryptologist technician for the NSA and support personnel for Navy Seal Team VI who was killed in Afghanistan, filed lawsuit challenging the constitutionality of the bulk metadata collection of phone records (Klayman I). Plaintiffs joined by Michael Ferrari and Matt Garrison filed a second lawsuit on June 12, 2013 challenging the constitutionality of bulk metadata collection of both phone and Internet communications (Klayman II).

In Klayman I, the plaintiffs, subscribers of Verizon Wireless, brought suit against the NSA, the Department of Justice, Verizon Communications, President Barack Obama, Eric Holder, the United States Attorney General, and General Keith B. Alexander, the Director of the National Security Agency. The plaintiffs alleged that the government is conducting a "secret and illegal government scheme to intercept vast quantities of domestic telephonic communications with" and that the program violates First, Fourth and Fifth Amendment and exceeds statutory authority granted by Section 215. In Klayman II, the plaintiffs sued the same government defendants and in addition, Facebook, Yahoo!, Google, Microsoft, YouTube, AOL, PalTalk, Skype, Sprint, AT&T, Apple again alleging the bulk metadata collection violates the First, Fourth and Fifth Amendment and constitutes divulgence of communication records in violation of Section 2702 of Stored Communications Act.

=== Others ===
On April 6, 2004, the American Civil Liberties Union sued the FBI and DHS over the USA PATRIOT Act's authority to demand that a business hand over records that may contain private financial or business information that is not pertinent to an ongoing investigation. The specific action in question was the request of the FBI and DHS for the account information for users of an Internet service provider.

Citing possible secrecy provisions of the USA PATRIOT Act, the Department of Justice prevented the ACLU from releasing the text of a countersuit for three weeks. After judicial and congressional oversight, sections of the countersuit that did not violate secrecy rules of the USA PATRIOT Act were released.

The lawsuit filed by the ACLU was dropped on October 27, 2006. ACLU stated it is withdrawing the lawsuit because of improvements to the law. "While the reauthorized Patriot Act is far from perfect, we succeeded in stemming the damage from some of the Bush administration's most reckless policies," said Ann Beeson, associate legal director of the ACLU.

In 2015, the Second Circuit appeals court ruled in ACLU v. Clapper that Section 215 of the Patriot Act did not authorize the bulk collection of phone metadata, which judge Gerard E. Lynch called a "staggering" amount of information.

== See also ==
- In re Electronic Privacy Information Center
- PRISM (surveillance program)
- Privacy and Civil Liberties Oversight Board report on mass surveillance
- Surveillance abuse
- Transparency report
