= Henry Hase (politician) =

American politician

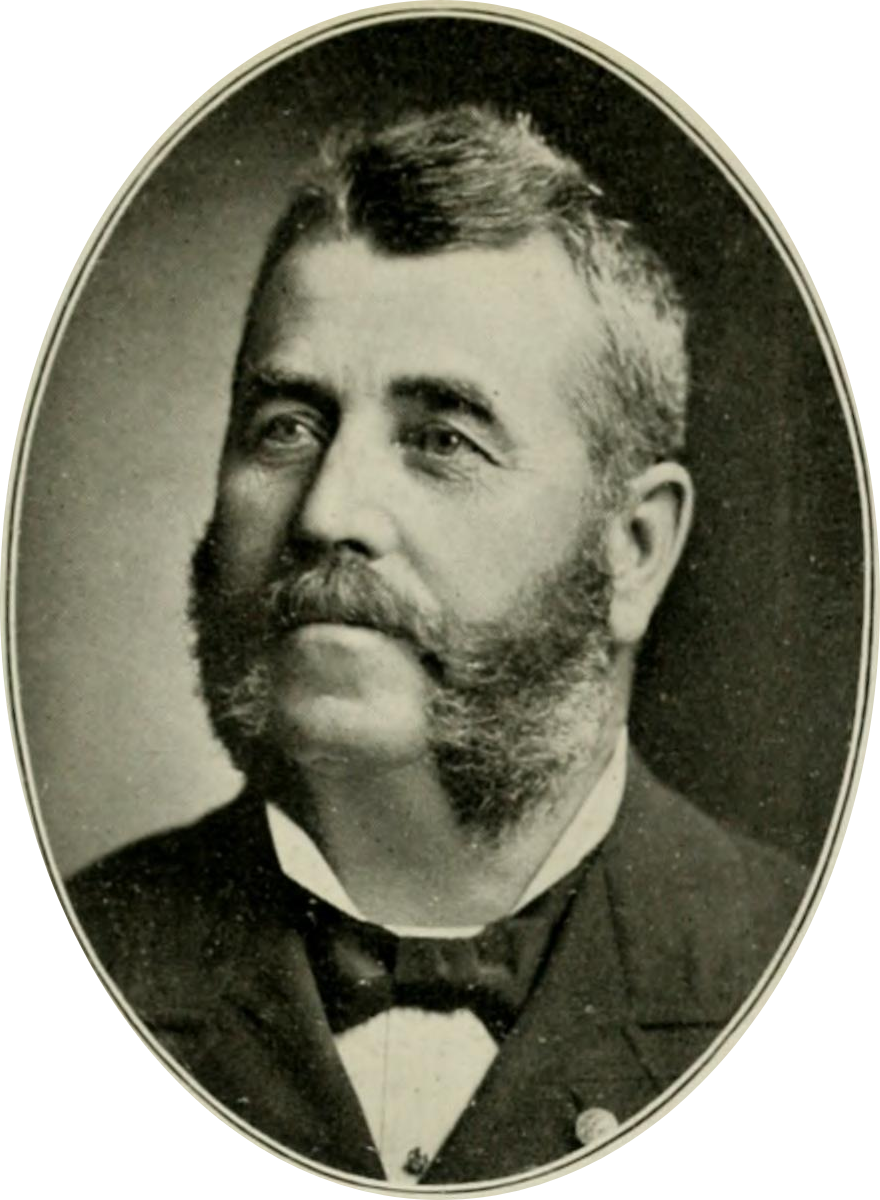
Hase c. 1902

Henry Hase (September 26, 1847 – January 25, 1929) was an American politician.

Hase served as acting mayor of Milwaukee, Wisconsin from June 5, 1893 until July 1, 1893, when Peter J. Somers resigned in order to serve in the United States House of Representatives. Born in Port Washington, Wisconsin, Hase worked for Pabst Brewing Company. During the American Civil War, he served in the Union army. Hase served on the Milwaukee Common Council and was President of the Common Council. He was buried at Graceland Cemetery in Milwaukee.
