= James Burkee =

American politician

President of Saint Leo University

Personal details
- Education: Northwestern University
- Alma mater: Concordia University Wisconsin
- Profession: President (Saint Leo University) President (Avila University) Vice President for Strategic Initiatives (College of Mount Saint Vincent) Professor Concordia University Wisconsin

James (Jim) Burkee is 12th President of Saint Leo University. Burkee served as the 15th President of Avila University in Missouri, Vice President for Strategic Initiatives at the College of Mount Saint Vincent in New York, Executive Vice President at Concordia College New York, and longtime professor of history at Concordia University Wisconsin and Concordia College New York. He is author of the award-winning 2011 book, Power, Politics and the Missouri Synod: A Conflict That Changed American Christianity. Burkee is a long-time advocate for civility in public discourse, running for office in 2008 with a unique, bi-partisan campaign for Congress in the fifth congressional district of Wisconsin for the U.S. House of Representatives.

== Personal life ==
Jim Burkee was born in San Diego, California and was raised both there and in Milwaukee, Wisconsin, now considering both his hometowns. Burkee's father, who flew the S-2 Tracker on two tours to Vietnam aboard the USS Kearsarge, died in 1978. Burkee graduated from Lutheran High School of San Diego, now Victory Christian Academy in Chula Vista, California.

=== Education ===
Burkee then attended Concordia University Wisconsin, graduating with degrees in business, marketing, and history. Working in manufacturing, the automotive industry, and finally as in accounting, Burkee matriculated in 1995 at Northwestern University’s graduate school, where he earned his Ph.D. in History in 2003, Burkee began his career of teaching.

=== Career ===
Burkee taught at two schools within the Concordia University System, Concordia College, Bronxville and Concordia University Wisconsin, the largest Lutheran school in the nation by enrollment. In 2019, Burkee joined the College of Mount Saint Vincent in Riverdale, New York. Burkee previously served as the 15th President of Avila University.

On August 5, 2025, Burkee was announced as the incoming 12th president of Saint Leo University in St. Leo, FL, starting September 1st.

== Political views ==
Burkee's 2008 campaign began as an experiment, based in part on the experience of Minnesota's Senator Paul Wellstone, who had been a Political Science professor at Carleton College prior to his election to the US Senate. Running with a faculty colleague and staff composed of students at Concordia University Wisconsin, Burkee generated national news with the bipartisan campaign, ultimately earning a ruling from the Federal Election Commission allowing both a Democrat and Republican to raise funds through a joint campaign structure. Longtime incumbent F. James Sensenbrenner defeated Burkee in the 2008 primary, with Burkee earning 29% of the district's vote.

== Higher Education Reform ==
Burkee has been an advocate for reform in higher education, particularly through public-private partnerships. In April 2018 Burkee joined a panel of college and university executives at George Mason University to discuss the promise and challenges of partnership-related growth in higher education. He is a strong advocate for public-private partnerships between colleges and universities and private organizations, and with the corporate sector.
