= John Pritzlaff Hardware Company =

- U.S. National Register of Historic Places
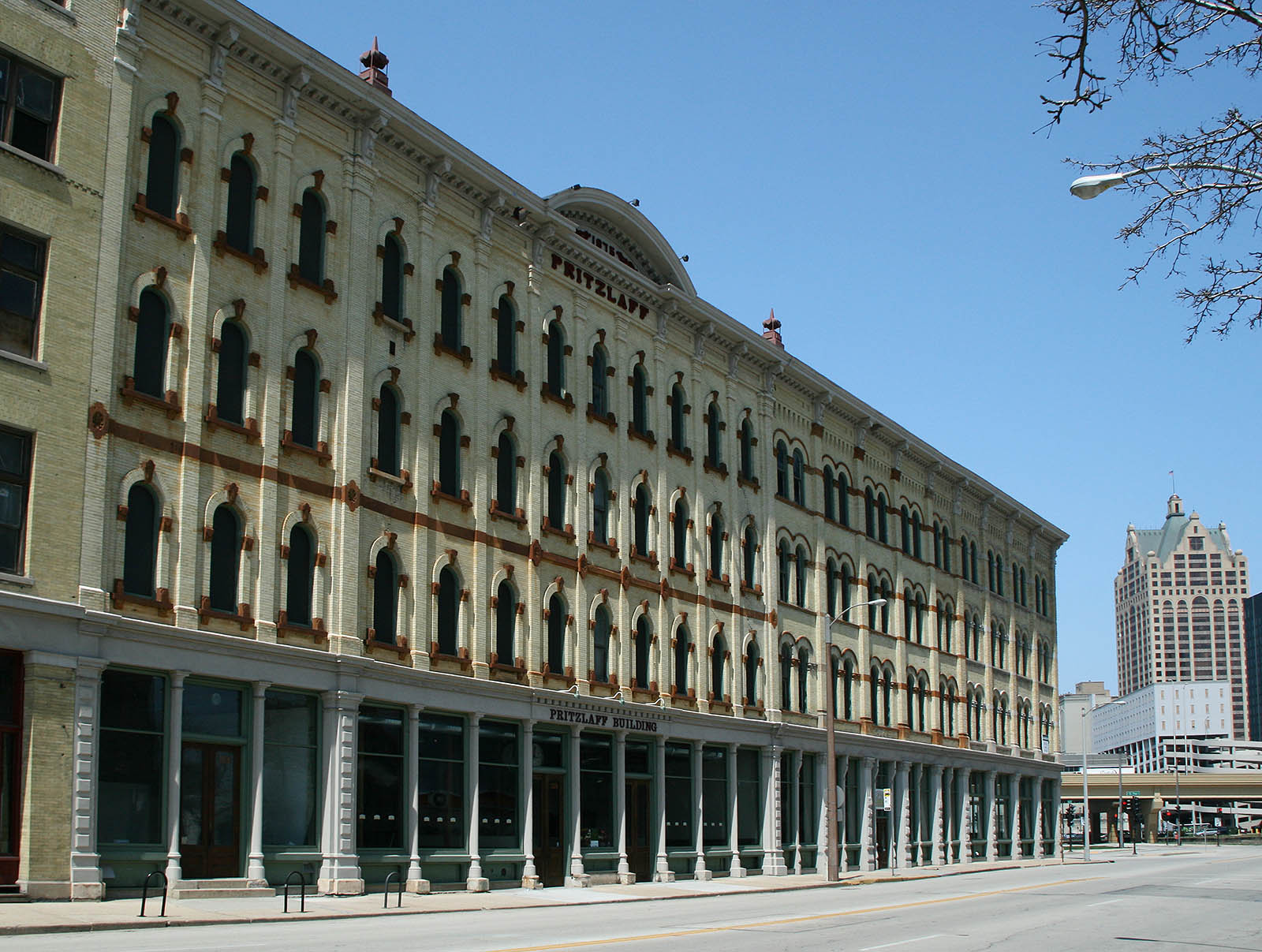
- Location: 305-333 N. Plankinton & 143, 155, W. St. Paul Aves. Milwaukee, Wisconsin
- Coordinates: 43.034337°N 87.911977°W
- Built: 1875-1919
- Architect: John Rugee, Klug & Smith
- Architectural style: Italianate
- NRHP reference No.: 12001187
- Added to NRHP: 2013-01-14

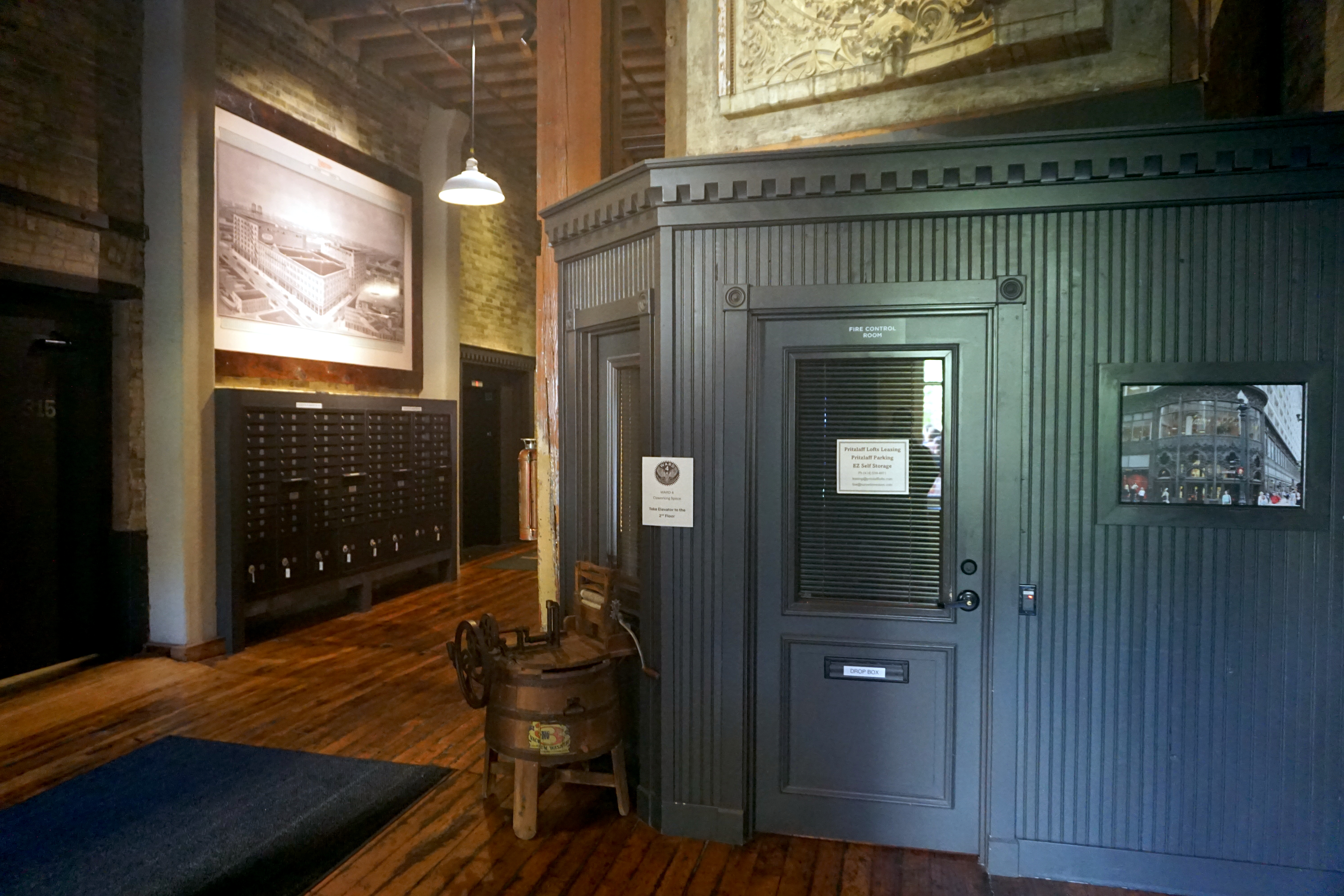
Interior of the John Pritzlaff Hardware Company building

The John Pritzlaff Hardware Company is a complex of Italianate-styled buildings built from 1875 to 1919, a remnant of what was for years the largest wholesale hardware business in Milwaukee and the region. In 2013 the buildings were listed on the National Register of Historic Places.

John C. Pritzlaff was an immigrant from Pomerania, Prussia, who came to Milwaukee in 1841, before Wisconsin was a state. In 1850 he, August Suelflohn, and Henry Nazro opened a small hardware store on Third Street called John Pritzlaff and Company. Pritzlaff became the sole owner in 1866.

In 1875 Pritzlaff moved his business to the current location and shifted from retail to wholesale hardware. In that year he built the first structure. That 1875 main block is a four-story brick building. It has brick hood moulds over the windows and a denticulated, bracketed cornice - typical of the Italianate style that was popular at that time. On one side the cornice is broken by a round-topped pediment which frames "1875 - Pritzlaff". Additions and other blocks were added in 1879, 1887, 1895, 1903, 1912, 1915 and 1919. The surviving blocks are all brick, in Italianate style. As the buildings grew, so did the staff, from 52 in 1881 to 450 in 1931.

Pritzlaff's enterprise became the largest hardware company in Milwaukee, Wisconsin and eventually became one of the largest wholesale hardware companies and iron supply houses in the Midwest. It was known for selling hardware, sewing machines, and toys through mail order catalogs to wholesale accounts throughout the United States.

After Pritzlaff died, his son, Fred C. Pritzlaff took over until his death in 1951. When Fred died, his son took over the firm until it closed in 1958.

Today the buildings have been renovated and converted into rental space for large events and high end apartments.
