= John C. Pritzlaff =

- Born: March 8, 1820; Prussia
- Died: March 18, 1900 (aged 80)
- Occupation: American businessman
- Known for: Owner of John Pritzlaff Hardware Company

John C. Pritzlaff (March 8, 1820 – March 18, 1900) was the founder of the John Pritzlaff Hardware Company, the largest wholesale hardware store in the Midwestern United States until its closure in 1958.

== Early life ==
Pritzlaff was born in 1820 in Truskolas, a village in the province of Pomerania, Prussia. In 1839, after the death of his father, Pritzlaff came to America at the age of 19, eventually settling in Milwaukee, Wisconsin Territory in 1841. He worked as a teamster and a cook, and cut timber at Schlitz Park, the former site of the Joseph Schlitz Brewing Company. In 1843, he was employed as a porter by Shepardson and Farwell, which was later acquired by Henry J. Nazro & Company.

== Career ==
In 1850, Nazro was a silent partner to Pritzlaff and another man, who together opened a small outfit called Pritzlaff & Company. By 1853, one partner had left, and the other had been bought out. Pritzlaff incorporated his hardware store in 1884 as the John Pritzlaff Hardware Company and became the president of the corporation, naming John C. Koch as the vice-president.

Pritzlaff's company continued to grow, making it the largest hardware company in Milwaukee. They moved to a second location and his store went on to be known as the largest wholesale hardware company and iron supply house in the Northwest, which is most likely is a reference to the Northwest Territory. When Pritzlaff died in 1900, he left behind a fortune nearing $8 million in today's value.

== Personal life ==
In 1844, Pritzlaff married Sophia Christine Blume. They had eight children: Elizabeth Sophia (1845–1916), who married John C. Koch; Anton (1847–1849); Auguste Emile (1850–1888), who married Franz Wollaeger, the secretary and treasurer of the John Pritzlaff Hardware Company; Mathilda (1855–1857); Louis (1858–1872); Amalia Emma (1851–1926), who married Herman August Luedke, the vice-president of the John Pritzlaff Hardware Company; and Fred C. Pritzlaff (1861–1951), who went on to be president of the John Pritzlaff Hardware Company until he died, and one stillborn child.
