= United States intelligence operations abroad =

The United States is widely considered to have one of, if not the most, extensive and sophisticated intelligence network of any nation in the world, with organizations including the Central Intelligence Agency and the National Security Agency, amongst others. It has conducted numerous espionage operations against foreign countries, including both allies and rivals. Its operations have included the use of industrial espionage, cyber espionage. and mass surveillance.

Many of these operations have generated public criticism as being unethical; examples include the overthrow of foreign governments, nonconsensual human experiments, extraordinary rendition, torture, targeted killings, assassinations, and the funding and training of militants who would go on to kill civilians and non-combatants. Through a combination of hacking and secret court orders against American technology companies, the United States has also employed mass surveillance of ordinary individuals, both American and foreign nationals alike.

== Edward Snowden disclosures on global surveillance ==
A cache of top secret documents leaked in 2013 by ex-NSA contractor Edward Snowden, who obtained them while working for Booz Allen Hamilton, one of the largest contractors for defense and intelligence in the United States., revealed operational details about the U.S. National Security Agency (NSA) and its international partners' global surveillance of foreign nationals and U.S. citizens. In addition to a trove of U.S. federal documents, Snowden's cache reportedly contains thousands of Australian, British and Canadian intelligence files that he had accessed via the exclusive "Five Eyes" network. In June 2013, the first of Snowden's documents were published simultaneously by The Washington Post and The Guardian, attracting considerable public attention. The disclosure continued throughout the entire year of 2013, and a significant portion of the full cache of the estimated 1.7 million documents was later obtained and published by many other media outlets worldwide, most notably The New York Times, the Canadian Broadcasting Corporation, the Australian Broadcasting Corporation, Der Spiegel (Germany), O Globo (Brazil), Le Monde (France), L'espresso (Italy), NRC Handelsblad (the Netherlands), Dagbladet (Norway), El País (Spain), and Sveriges Television (Sweden).

These media reports have shed light on the implications of several secret treaties signed by members of the UKUSA community in their efforts to implement global surveillance. For example, Der Spiegel revealed how the German Bundesnachrichtendienst (BND) transfers "massive amounts of intercepted data to the NSA", while Sveriges Television revealed the National Defence Radio Establishment (FRA) provided the NSA with data from its cable collection, under a secret treaty signed in 1954 for bilateral cooperation on surveillance. Other security and intelligence agencies involved in the practice of global surveillance include those in Australia (ASD), Britain (GCHQ), Canada (CSEC), Denmark (PET), France (DGSE), Germany (BND), Italy (AISE), the Netherlands (AIVD), Norway (NIS), Spain (CNI), Switzerland (NDB), as well as Israel (ISNU), which receives raw, unfiltered data of U.S. citizens that is shared by the NSA.

The disclosure provided impetus for the creation of social movements against mass surveillance, such as Restore the Fourth, and actions like Stop Watching Us and The Day We Fight Back. On the legal front, the Electronic Frontier Foundation joined a coalition of diverse groups filing suit against the NSA. Several human rights organizations have urged the Obama administration not to prosecute, but protect, "whistleblower Snowden": Amnesty International, Human Rights Watch, Transparency International, and the Index on Censorship, inter alia.

== Cyber espionage ==
Snowden's revelations confirmed that the United States, together with Israel, conducted Operation Olympic Games, a covert and still unacknowledged campaign of sabotage by means of cyber disruption, directed at Iranian nuclear facilities. As reported, it was one of the first known uses of offensive cyber weapons. Started under the George W. Bush administration in 2006, Olympic Games was accelerated under President Obama, who heeded Bush's advice to continue cyber attacks on Iranian nuclear facility at Natanz. Amongst other things, they created the computer worm Stuxnet, which spread beyond Iran's nuclear facilities to the internet, causing collateral damage in other nations such as India and Indonesia.

== Industrial espionage ==
In 1994, United States trade officials were accompanied with CIA agents to various international locations such as London and Geneva to spy on Japanese auto executives and government officials during Japan-U.S. negotiations on automotive trade.

An article in the New York Times wrote:

Spying on allies for economic advantage is a crucial new assignment for the C.I.A. now that American foreign policy is focused on commercial interests abroad. President Clinton made economic intelligence a high priority of his Administration, specifically information to protect and defend American competitiveness, technology and financial security in a world where an economic crisis can spread across global markets in minutes.

== Targeted killings and assassinations ==
In April 2010, U.S. President Barack Obama placed Anwar al-Awlaki on a list of people whom the U.S. Central Intelligence Agency was authorized to kill because of terrorist activities. The "targeted killing" of an American citizen was unprecedented. Al-Awlaki's father and civil rights groups challenged the order in court. Al-Awlaki was believed to be in hiding in Southeast Yemen in the last years of his life. The U.S. deployed unmanned aircraft (drones) in Yemen to search for and kill him, firing at and failing to kill him at least once, before succeeding in a fatal American drone attack in Yemen on September 30, 2011. Two weeks later, al-Awlaki's 16-year-old son, Abdulrahman al-Awlaki, a U.S. citizen who was born in Denver, was killed by a CIA-led drone strike in Yemen. Nasser al-Awlaki, Anwar's father, released an audio recording condemning the killings of his son and grandson as senseless murders. In June 2014, a previously classified memorandum issued by the United States Department of Justice was released, justifying al-Awlaki's death as a lawful act of war.

== Intelligence activity by location ==
=== Europe ===
==== France ====
In 1993, the CIA's Paris station launched an economic espionage operation to gain an advantage in negotiations over the 1994 General Agreement on Tariffs and Trade. They attempted to use a female operative posing as a public relations director for a save-the-rain-forest foundation as a honeypot trap to ensnare Henri Plagnol, an aide to French prime minister Édouard Balladur. However, Plagnol was warned by French counterintelligence officers who had seen through the plot and told him to play along. Over the course of two years, the French used Plagnol to turn the tables on the CIA, uncovering multiple CIA operatives and ultimately publicly expelling the CIA Paris station chief along with other key agents from the country.

==== Germany ====
The CIA recruited over a dozen spies working in multiple German industries, including a double agent in German intelligence. These spies were uncovered in raids on the Ministry of Defense by German authorities in 2014. Angela Merkel, whose personal cellphone was tapped by the NSA, ordered the CIA's Berlin station chief to leave the country.

In May 2021, Denmark's public service broadcaster, DR, revealed that the Danish Defence Intelligence Service helped the NSA spy on European leaders including German Chancellor Angela Merkel from 2012 to 2014, in a scheme codenamed as "Operation Dunhammer". Intelligence was also collected on other officials from Germany, France, Sweden and Norway.

=== Middle East ===
==== Iran ====
In 1953, the CIA worked with the United Kingdom to overthrow the democratically elected government of Iran led by Prime Minister Mohammad Mossadegh who had attempted to nationalize Iran's petroleum industry, threatening the profits of the Anglo-Iranian Oil Company, now known as BP. Declassified CIA documents show that Britain was fearful of Iran's plans to nationalize its oil industry and pressed the U.S. to mount a joint operation to depose the prime minister and install a puppet regime. In 1951 the Iranian parliament voted to nationalize the petroleum fields of the country.

The coup was led by CIA operative Kermit Roosevelt, Jr. (grandson of President Theodore Roosevelt). With help from British intelligence, the CIA planned, funded and implemented Operation Ajax. In the months before the coup, the UK and U.S. imposed a boycott of the country, exerted other political pressures, and conducted a massive covert propaganda campaign to create the environment necessary for the coup. The CIA hired Iranian agents provocateurs who posed as communists, harassed religious leaders and staged the bombing of one cleric's home to turn the Islamic religious community against the government. For the U.S. audience, the CIA hoped to plant articles in U.S. newspapers saying that Shah Mohammed Reza Pahlevi's return to govern Iran resulted from a homegrown revolt against what was being represented to the U.S. public as a communist-leaning government. The CIA successfully used its contacts at the Associated Press to put on the newswire in the U.S. a statement from Tehran about royal decrees that the CIA itself had written.

The coup initially failed and the Shah fled the country. After four days of rioting, Shi'ite-sparked street protests backed by pro-Shah army units defeated Mossadeq's forces and the Shah returned to power.

The CIA subsequently used the apparent success of their Iranian coup project to bolster their image in American government circles. They expanded their reach into other countries, taking a greater portion of American intelligence assets based on their record in Iran.

In August 2013 the CIA admitted that it was involved in both the planning and the execution of the coup, including the bribing of Iranian politicians, security and army high-ranking officials, as well as pro-coup propaganda. The CIA is quoted acknowledging the coup was carried out "under CIA direction" and "as an act of U.S. foreign policy, conceived and approved at the highest levels of government." The National Security Archive said it that while it "applauds the CIA's decision to make these materials available, today's posting shows clearly that these materials could have been safely declassified many years ago without risk of damage to national security."

=== East Asia ===
==== China ====
The New York Times reported in May 2017 that "the Chinese government systematically dismantled C.I.A. spying operations in the country starting in 2010, killing or imprisoning more than a dozen sources over two years and crippling intelligence gathering there for years afterward. Current and former American officials described the intelligence breach as one of the worst in decades."

==== Taiwan ====
Since the mid-1980s, the NSA and Taiwan's National Security Bureau have jointly operated a signals intelligence (SIGINT) listening station at Yangmingshan.

== See also ==
- CIA activities by country
- Office of Strategic Influence
- United States and state-sponsored terrorism
