= Barack Obama on mass surveillance =

President Obama addresses NSA mass surveillance in a speech on January 17, 2014

Former U.S. President Barack Obama had a mixed record in regards to support of mass surveillance over his political career. While as a senator he initially condemned the Patriot Act, he later defended the actions of the NSA revealed by documents leaked by NSA whistleblower Edward Snowden.

While some critics have said the policies he supported violated privacy rights, others dispute this characterization or provide justifications for the expansion of surveillance initiatives under his administration.

== The Patriot Act ==
As a senator, Obama condemned the Patriot Act for violating the rights of American citizens, arguing that it allowed government agents to conduct extensive and in-depth searches on American citizens without a search warrant. He also contended that it was possible to secure the United States against terrorist attacks while preserving individual liberty. However, in 2011, Obama signed a four-year renewal of the Patriot Act, specifically provisions allowing roaming wiretaps and government searches of business records. Obama argued that the renewal was necessary to protect the United States from terrorist attacks. Despite this, the renewal faced criticism from several members of Congress who argued that the provisions did not do enough to limit excessive searches. Obama also received criticism for his reversal on privacy protection.

== Initial reaction to NSA mass surveillance leaks ==
In June 2013, reports from a cache of top secret documents leaked by ex-NSA contractor Edward Snowden revealed that the U.S. National Security Agency (NSA) and its international partners had created a global system of surveillance that was responsible for the mass collection of information on American and foreign citizens.

Obama initially defended NSA mass surveillance programs when they were first leaked. He argued that NSA surveillance was transparent and claimed that the NSA is unable and had made no attempt to monitor the phone calls and emails of American citizens. Following Snowden's admission to leaking classified documents regarding national surveillance, Obama attempted to ignore the issue of NSA surveillance. It was speculated that Obama did this to avoid complicating the Department of Justice investigation into Snowden.

In August 2013, Obama argued that his administration was already in the process of reviewing the NSA surveillance programs when they were leaked by Snowden. Obama stated that it would have been best for the American people to have never learned about the programs. He also criticized Snowden for not using existing systems within the federal government for whistleblowers. The latter statement was criticized, as Snowden would have been directed to one of the committees responsible for protecting the secrecy of NSA surveillance if he had used the existing whistleblower system. However, he also promised to make public information about government surveillance and work with Congress to increase public confidence in the government.

== January 17, 2014 speech ==
On January 17, 2014, President Obama gave a public address on mass surveillance.

External videos
- President Obama speech on global surveillance, January 17, 2014 on YouTube (transcript)

During the speech, Obama promised increased restrictions on data collection of American citizens, which would include the requirement of court approval for searches of telephone records. In addition, Obama called for increased oversight and admitted the dangers NSA surveillance posed to civil liberties.

=== Reactions ===
Obama's speech was criticized for being deliberately vague and not going far enough to protect civil liberties.

Representatives for Google, Facebook and Yahoo stated that Obama's proposed reforms represented positive progress, but that they did not ultimately do enough to protect privacy rights. A representative for Mozilla noted that mass surveillance had damaged the open Internet and caused balkanization and distrust.

Sen. Rand Paul criticized the remarks, saying:

While I am encouraged the President is addressing the NSA spying program because of pressure from Congress and the American people, I am disappointed in the details. The Fourth Amendment requires an individualized warrant based on probable cause before the government can search phone records and e-mails. President Obama’s announced solution to the NSA spying controversy is the same unconstitutional program with a new configuration. I intend to continue the fight to restore Americans' rights through my Fourth Amendment Restoration Act and my legal challenge against the NSA. The American people should not expect the fox to guard the hen house.

Dianne Feinstein, a member of the Senate Intelligence Committee, stated that all but two or three of the members of her committee support Obama. Likewise, she criticized "privacy people" for not understanding the threat terrorists pose to the United States. Mike Rogers, the chair of the House Intelligence Committee, praised Obama's stance on NSA surveillance. Peter King, another member of the House Intelligence Committee, questioned the need for the proposed reform of NSA surveillance, but admitted that they were necessary to calm down the "ACLU types".

Reactions from global leaders were limited. Great Britain and Russia, both states with extensive surveillance programs, offered no comments. Dilma Rousseff, the current president of Brazil and an outspoken critic of NSA surveillance, also refused to comment. In Germany, a government spokesperson demanded greater protection for non-Americans in reaction to the speech. Der Spiegel accused the NSA of turning the internet into a weapons system. The European Union stated that Obama's pledge to reform the phone data collection is a step in the right direction, but demanded that actual laws be passed regarding this reform.

=== Scorecard ===
The Electronic Frontier Foundation and The Day We Fight Back released a report card" evaluating Obama's reform:

Stop mass surveillance of digital communications and communication records	.2
Protect the privacy rights of foreigners.	.3
No data retention mandate.	0
Ban no-review National Security Letters.	.5
Stop undermining Internet security.	0
Oppose the FISA Improvements Act.	1
Reject the third party doctrine.	0
Provide a full public accounting of our surveillance apparatus.	.5
Embrace meaningful transparency reform.	0
Reform the FISA court.	1
Protect national security whistleblowers.	0
Give criminal defendants all surveillance evidence.	0

A full point was awarded in each category where Obama fully made the promised reform. However, partial points were awarded for reforms that had not been fully completed, but where the EFF and The Day We Fight Back felt that progress as being made. Obama received praise for adding independent advocates to the Foreign Intelligence Surveillance Act (FISA) courts and opposing the FISA Improvements Act. However, it was also noted that Obama had not made any progress on giving metadata storage responsibility to a third party, ending the undermining of encryption standards, increasing transparency within the NSA and protecting whistleblowers.

== Statements to the German people ==
On January 18, 2014, Obama spoke to ZDF in an attempt to improve the United States relations with Germany, which a German foreign office official said were "worse than … the low-point in 2003 during the Iraq War" due to the surveillance leaks. Obama promised that he would not let revelations about mass surveillance damage German-American relations and admitted that it would take a long time for the United States to regain the trust of the German people. However, he maintained that the surveillance was necessary for international security.

German reactions to the speeches given by Obama on January 17 and 18 ranged from skeptical to outright hostile. Members of the German media argued that they were hopeful that Obama would bring about needed reform. However, they also noted that his statements were vague and argued that they did not represent legitimate reform. Many German political leaders responded with outright hostility. Thomas Oppermann, the chairman of the German Social Democrats, demanded a no-spy treaty and stated that American surveillance constituted a crime. The German attorney general argued that there were grounds for a criminal investigation into the NSA's tapping of Angela Merkel's cell phone.

== Proposed overhaul of NSA phone surveillance programs ==
On March 25, 2014, Obama promised to end the NSA's collection and storage of bulk phone-call data. Despite this promise, his administration continued to seek reauthorization of the telephone metadata program. It is approved every 90 days by the FISC, with the most recent authority set to expire June 1, 2015. In a plan submitted by the Obama Administration to Congress, the NSA would be required to conduct searches of data at phone companies. They would also need to receive a warrant from a federal judge to conduct the search.

The overhaul proposal received support from the American Civil Liberties Union. A representative of the organization claimed that it was a crucial first step in reining in NSA surveillance. The overhaul was criticized by several officials, however, because it would force telephone carriers to store customers' metadata that they were previously not legally obligated to keep, a representative of Sprint Corporation stated that the carrier was examining the president's proposal with great interest.

As of March 2015, the administration's proposals have not been implemented and the NSA retains the authority to collect and store telephone record metadata.

== Abuses and 4th Amendment Violations by the NSA and FBI ==
On May 24, 2017, a declassified FISA report marked "Top Secret" was published, noting that the NSA routinely violated the 4th Amendment rights of Americans and abused intelligence tools to do so. The Obama administration self-disclosed the problems at a closed-door hearing on Oct. 26 before the Foreign Intelligence Surveillance Court, two weeks before the 2016 election. The report labeled the matter a “very serious Fourth Amendment issue," citing an "institutional lack of candor" on the part of the administration. It also criticized the NSA as having “disregard” for rules and “deficient” oversight.

More than 5 percent, or one out of every 20 searches seeking upstream Internet data on Americans inside the NSA's so-called Section 702 database, violated the safeguards the Obama administration vowed to follow in 2011. In addition, there was a three-fold increase in NSA data searches about Americans and a rise in the unmasking of U.S. person's identities in intelligence reports after the administration loosened privacy rules in 2011. Many of the searches involved any and all mentions of foreign targets.

Officials like former National Security Adviser Susan Rice have argued their activities were legal under the so-called minimization rule changes the Obama administration made, and that the intelligence agencies were strictly monitored to avoid abuses. The FISA court and the NSA's own internal watchdog entity disputes this claim, stating that the administration conducting such queries were "in violation of that prohibition, with much greater frequency than had been previously disclosed to the Court.”

=== Sharing of data by the FBI ===
The FISA report also indicated hundreds of incidences in which the FBI illegally shared raw surveillance data illegally obtained by the NSA with private entities. Earlier in May, then-FBI Director James Comey told lawmakers his agency used sensitive espionage data gathered about Americans without a warrant only when it was “lawfully collected, carefully overseen and checked.” The ruling in the report declared that “The Court is nonetheless concerned about the FBI’s apparent disregard of minimization rules and whether the FBI is engaging in similar disclosures of raw Section 702 information that have not been reported.”

In a declassified report from 2015, the internal watchdog had concerns as early as 2012 that the FBI was submitting "deficient” reports indicating it had a clean record complying with spy data gathered on Americans without a warrant. While Section 702 of the Foreign Surveillance Act, last updated by Congress in 2008, allowed the NSA to share with the FBI spy data collected without a warrant, the FISA report indicates FBI compliance problems began months after the updated legislation was implemented. The FBI's very first compliance report in 2009 declared it had not found any instances in which agents accessed NSA intercepts supposedly gathered overseas about an American who in fact was on U.S. soil. The Inspector General, however, said it reviewed the same data and easily found evidence that the FBI accessed NSA data gathered on a person who likely was in the United States, making it illegal to review without a warrant.

=== Reaction ===
On April 28, 2017, the NSA issued a rare press release indicating it will no longer monitor all internet communications that mention a foreign intelligence target.

Neema Singh Guliani, the ACLU's legislative counsel in Washington, DC stated, “I think what this emphasizes is the shocking lack of oversight of these programs." Chris Farrell, Director of Investigations for the watchdog group Judicial Watch asserted, "This is an abuse of power and authority like we have never seen in this country."

== See also ==
- Reactions to global surveillance disclosures
- Political positions of Barack Obama
