= The Day We Fight Back =

Protest against mass surveillance by the NSA

- Part of Reactions to global surveillance disclosures
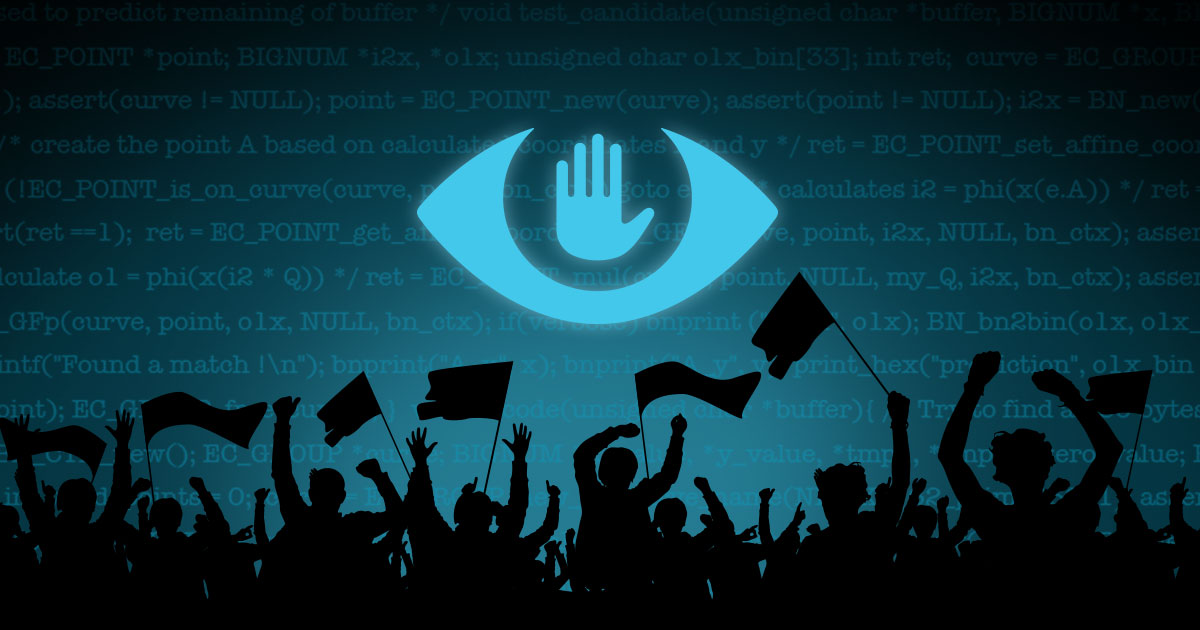
- The banner of The Day We Fight Back
- Date: February 11, 2014
- Location: Online plus physical protests in various locals
- Caused by: Snowden leaks, Global surveillance
- Goals: Strengthen and pass USA Freedom Act; Oppose the FISA Improvements Act; Enact protections for non-Americans
- Methods: Website banners and various actions
- Result: 90,474 calls and 188,198 emails to Congress.; Primary goal of passage of the USA Freedom Act incomplete.

Lead figures
Planning: Sina Khanifar; David Segal; Rainey Reitman; Thomas Davis; Along with: Demand Progress, Electronic Frontier Foundation, Fight for the Future, Free Press organization, Reddit, Mozilla, and Boing Boing.	Notable Participants: Facebook; AOL; Twitter; LinkedIn; Yahoo; Wikia; Google
- Motto: The Day We Fight Back against mass surveillance thedaywefightback.org

The Day We Fight Back was a mostly online protest on February 11, 2014, as a result of the Snowden disclosures. More than 6,000 websites participated, which primarily took the form of webpage banner-advertisements that read, "Dear Internet, we're sick of complaining about the NSA. We want new laws that curtail online surveillance. Today we fight back." Organizers hoped lawmakers would be made aware "that there's going to be ongoing public pressure until these reforms are instituted."

The protest was announced on January 10, 2014, by the Electronic Frontier Foundation (EFF). Other early organizers included digital rights groups such as Fight for the Future, and Free Press, as well as social media website Reddit, Firefox producer Mozilla, collaborative blogging website Boing Boing, and populist advocacy group "The Other 98%".

According to the official website, the protest asked U.S. "legislators to oppose the FISA Improvements Act, support the USA Freedom Act, and enact protections for non-Americans." Protest organizers said roughly 96,000 calls were placed to members of Congress and 555,000 "pro-privacy emails" were sent via the website.

== Purpose ==
The Day We Fight Back was a day of "worldwide solidarity" in protest against global telecommunications surveillance, the state of which — organizers contended — was too broad in scope, too difficult for telecom corporations to comply with, and incompatible with "democratic governance." The event was said to be in honor of the late open-Internet activist Aaron Swartz. It was organized domestically in response to then-pending legislation, and internationally in response to the general attitudes and voting history of legislatures concerning relevant laws.

Organizers posted to their website: "Together we will push back against powers that seek to observe, collect, and analyze our every digital action. Together, we will make it clear that such behavior is not compatible with democratic governance. Together, if we persist, we will win this fight." Rainey Reitman, director of activism at the EFF, said, "The idea is to really harness the outrage of the Internet community in speaking out in one big voice on Feb. 11."

The protest comes a month after President Obama made a surveillance reform speech introducing his proposed changes to the collection of US citizens' data. Critics said the reformations wouldn't be "nearly enough."

In the United States, a main goal of the protest was to encourage passage of the USA Freedom Act, a bill that, among other purposes, sought to limit the NSA's collection of data transmitted through telephony. The legislation was signed into law on June 2, 2015. Additionally, the banner urged people to contact members of the United States Congress and express their opposition to the FISA Improvements Act — which the ACLU criticized, calling it "a dream come true for the NSA" that would "codify the NSA's unconstitutional call-records program and allow bulk collection of location data from mobile phone users."

Organizers compared the February protest with the SOPA protest two years prior, stating that today "we face a different threat, one that undermines the Internet and the notion that any of us live in a genuinely free society" — specifically, coordinated, international efforts, like the Five Eyes; and mass surveillance programs in general, such as the United States' PRISM, and the United Kingdom's Tempora. Organizers called upon Canadians to join the protest as well, highlighting their concerns regarding the then-recent disclosures of CSEC's airport activities — in which Canadian intelligence officers used an airport's public wifi system to track the activities of travelers connected to it, and continued to track them whenever they used other access points operated by the same provider.

A Guardian op-ed in favor of the demonstration described the international objective as similar, but more abstract than its American counterpart — the goal being simply to promote a shift from policies in their current state "toward policies favoring liberty and privacy."

== Background ==
=== Promotion ===
The Day We Fight Back was promoted in a trailer for an upcoming documentary about Aaron Swartz, currently titled The Internet's Own Boy. In the clip, the late activist comments on mass surveillance: "It is shocking to think that the accountability is so lax that they don't even have sort of basic statistics about how big the spying programme is. If the answer is, 'Oh, we're spying on so many people we can't possibly even count them,' then that's an awful lot of people." Five months after Swartz's death, the scale of a vast global surveillance program would be revealed in great detail through the release of top-secret NSA documents by Edward Snowden.

Amy Goodman of Democracy Now! promoted The Day We Fight Back in an opinion article in the Athens News, noting Swartz's role in the digital rights movement calling for "another fight for the freedom of the Internet" without him.

=== Reddit "Ask Me Anything" ===
Comparing the opposition to surveillance with the previous defeat of SOPA, in which Demand Progress and Aaron Swartz had been deeply involved, the organizers took to Reddit and called for a month of activities culminating in the February 11 "day of action" In an "Ask Me Anything" (AMA) discussion held on January 10, several organizers announced the action and fielded user questions, saying their purpose was to answer questions "about Aaron and a protest we're organizing on 02/11 in his honor". Those participating were Cory Doctorow of BoingBoing; Brian Knappenberger, who made the films The Internet's Own Boy, a documentary about Aaron Swartz, and We Are Legion, a film about the hacker group "Anonymous"; David Segal, co-founder of Demand Progress; Peter Eckersley of EFF; and Sina Khanifar, website developer for "The Day We Fight Back" and several other activist projects. Doctorow and Eckersley indicated they had been close friends of Swartz.

On February 11, organizers again held an AMA and issued the following statement:

Two years ago, reddit and its users joined in fighting back against dangerous Internet censorship legislation during the SOPA protests. You blacked out your websites and started hundreds of creative campaigns to defeat a piece of legislation that threatened freedom on the Internet.

In the last 6 months we've seen that government agencies, namely the NSA and GCHQ and others, have broken laws and twisted legal interpretations to create an infrastructure of mass surveillance of all of us online. This creates a dark form of censorship as people become afraid to speak freely -- and it's one that undermines our security and our right to privacy as well. As users of the Internet, we have a responsibility to defend its freedom.

=== Inspiration from Aaron Swartz ===
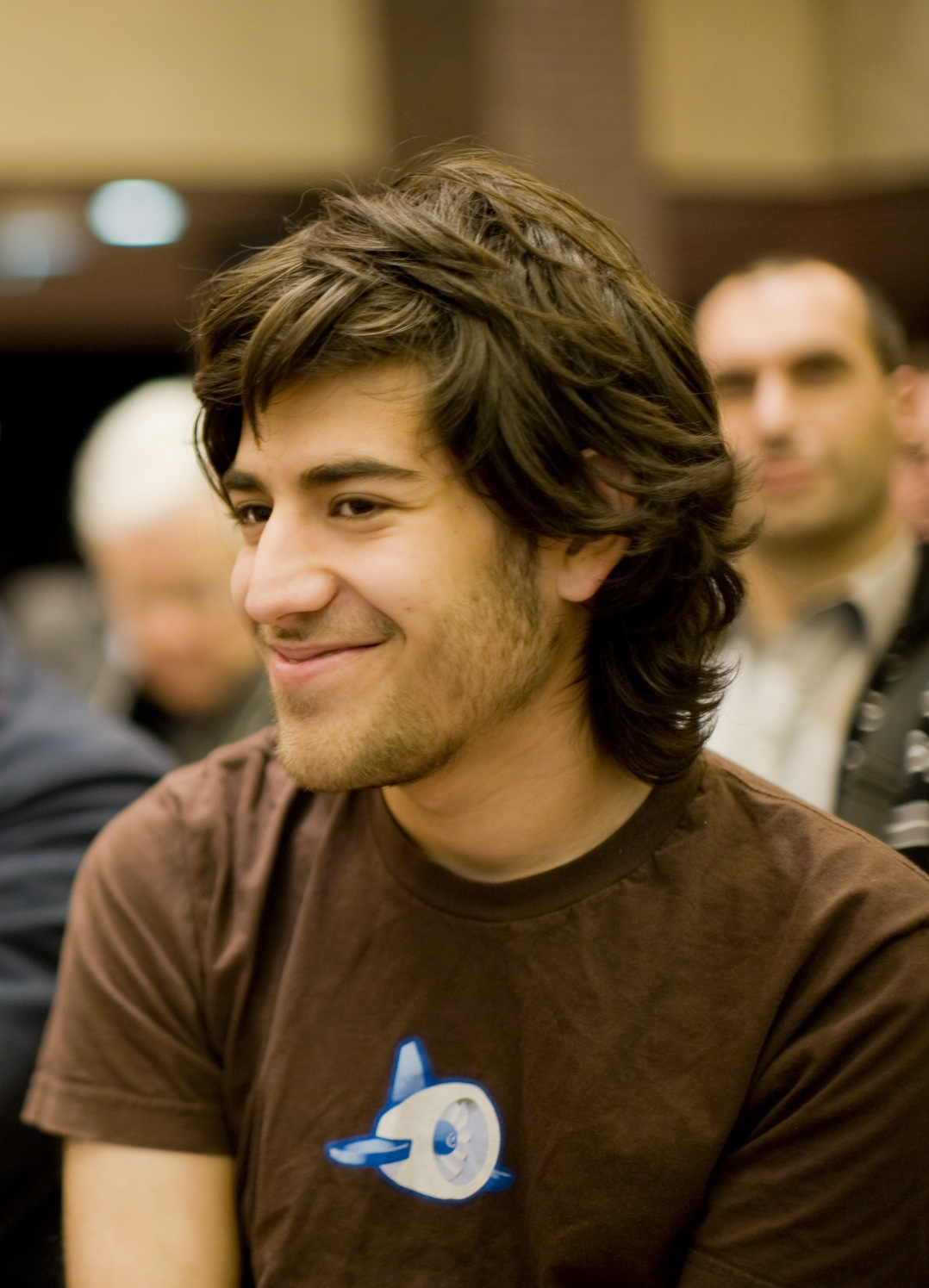
Aaron Swartz

Aaron Swartz was an American activist who founded the online group Demand Progress, known for its campaign against the Stop Online Piracy Act (SOPA). Swartz, a fellow at Harvard, was arrested by MIT police after systematically downloading academic journal articles from JSTOR.

The US Department of Justice charged Aaron Swartz with multiple felonies. He faced a potential penalty of 35 years confinement in a federal penitentiary. On January 11, 2013, two days after the prosecution denied his lawyer's second offer of a plea bargain, Swartz was found dead, having hanged himself. Many commentators viewed the prosecution, which could have imposed a devastating prison term for accessing information in bulk rather than one article at a time, as 'bullying' that ultimately lead to Swartz's death.

February 11, 2014, the planned day of protest, falls one month after the first anniversary of the death of Aaron Swartz.

Swartz's brother, Noah Swartz, was "actively organizing" The Day We Fight Back.

David Segal said in a statement,

Today the greatest threat to a free Internet, and broader free society, is the National Security Agency's mass spying regime. If Aaron were alive he'd be on the front lines, fighting back against these practices that undermine our ability to engage with each other as genuinely free human beings.

In the clip, Swartz comments on mass surveillance,

It is shocking to think that the accountability is so lax that they don't even have sort of basic statistics about how big the spying programme is. If the answer is, 'Oh, we're spying on so many people we can't possibly even count them,' then that's an awful lot of people." Five months after Swartz's death, the scale of a vast global surveillance program would be revealed in great detail through the release of top-secret NSA documents by Edward Snowden. The film follows director Brian Knappenberger's recent op-ed documentary for The New York Times titled "Why Care About the NSA?"

== Related events ==
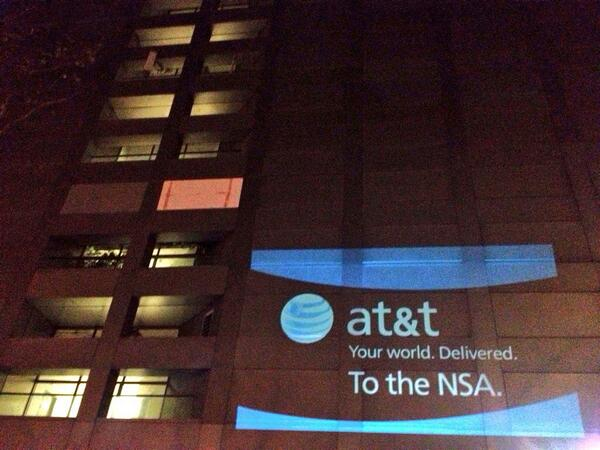
"Your world delivered ... to the NSA. On AT&T building in SF where whistleblower Mark Klein saw the NSA spying room." Tweeted by Kurt Opsohl, attorney with the EFF; from "The Day We Fight Back" protest in San Francisco, February 11, 2014

Related demonstrations were scheduled in 15 countries. Activities to support the protest took place "from Argentina to Uganda, from Colombia to the Philippines". Events included:

- Bitbureauet, a Denmark-based think-tank, announced plans for a protest outside the US embassy in Copenhagen, using the slogan "tag internettet tilbage" ('take back the internet').
- Restore the Fourth, an American organization, planned a protest outside the AT&T Building in San Francisco that houses Room 641A, the facility operated by AT&T for the U.S. National Security Agency. According to the organization, the protest will feature a speech by Mark Klein, the AT&T technician who publicly exposed the facility in 2006. The EFF has announced plans for an event in Bluffdale, Utah, near the Utah Data Center. The Rhode Island Coalition to Defend Human and Civil Rights and Rhode Island MoveOn.org announced a protest outside federal courthouse in Providence.
- The Pirate Party of Sweden will hold a demonstration in Stockholm with speeches by party founder Rick Falkvinge and party leader Anna Troberg. Cryptoparty-Austria has announced plans for a rally in Forum Stadtpark in Graz. The Software Freedom Law Center announced plans to host an event in New Delhi.
- KBOO, an Oregon-based listener-funded radio station, scheduled a day of special programming related to Internet activism.
- In Manila, protestors rallied outside the Supreme Court against the surveillance-related "Philippines 2012 Cybercrime Prevention Act".
- A UK-based coalition called "Don't Spy on Us" organized its own protest. The coalition included the Open Rights Group, English Pen, Liberty, Privacy International, Big Brother Watch and Article 19.

== Supporters ==
Supporting the digital protest was a "broad coalition of activist groups, companies, and online platforms". The Guardian observed that supporters included unlikely bedfellows, citing backing from both American Civil Liberties Union and the "very conservative" FreedomWorks. Political parties supporting the protest included the US National Libertarian Party, the Australian Greens, the Pirate Party of Sweden, and Ron Paul's Campaign for Liberty. Congressman Ted Poe (R-TX) has also endorsed the protest.

The "most prominent addition" to the protest was the "Reform Government Surveillance" coalition, which includes AOL, Twitter, LinkedIn, and Yahoo. It was not initially clear how the sites would participate. The group sent a letter to President Obama on November 11 and "urged changes that would include a government agreement not to collect bulk data from Internet communications." On the same day, Google announced its support for the USA Freedom Act, saying "Google recognizes the very real threats that the U.S. and other countries face, but we strongly believe that government surveillance programs should operate under a legal framework that is rule-bound, narrowly tailored, transparent, and subject to oversight." Matt Simons, director of social and economic justice at ThoughtWorks, nevertheless said the coalition's support of The Day We Fight Back "rings a little hollow" because of the late date of its announcement and its member's past disclosure of their customers' data to the NSA.

Groups supporting The Day We Fight Back include the EFF, the ACLU, Freedomworks, Greenpeace, Demand Progress, Human Rights Watch, the Government Accountability Project, Restore the Fourth, the Free Software Foundation, and Amnesty International. Websites supporting the protest included Reddit, Tumblr, Wikia, Mozilla, Facebook, and Google.

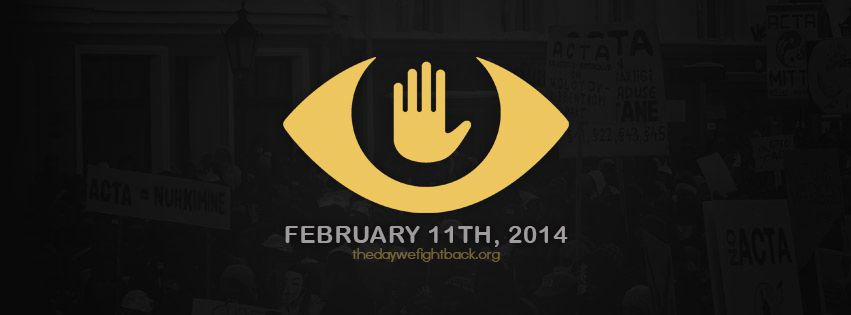
February 11, 2014

By February 11, more than 6,000 websites and organizations had signed up to show support by featuring The Day We a Fight Back banner for 24 hours. The Huffington Post released images of various memes meant to be posted to sites like Facebook and Twitter as part of the event. Tens of thousands of individuals pledged to make calls and Internet posts supporting surveillance reform.

== Reaction ==
By mid-day, organizers said supporters had sent 104,000 emails and made nearly 50,000 calls to Congress.

On Twitter, the hashtag "StopTheNSA" became a 'trending' topic. Joining tech companies and public figures, lawmakers voiced support using the online platform, including Tom Udall, Jerry Nadler, Rick Larsen, Ron Wyden, Raul M. Grijalva, Mike Honda, Mark Pocan, Alan Grayson, and Rand Paul.

Senator Bernie Sanders (I-VT) posted:

What I worry about is kids growing up in a society where they say 'if I send this email or if I visit this website, then somebody may think I'm a terrorist. I'm not going to talk about this issue, I'm not going to read this book, I'm not going to explore this idea.' I don't want anyone thinking about that. It upsets me very much and is not the kind of free society I think we should be living in.

As February 11 drew to a close, The New York Times posted a blog titled "The Day the Internet Didn't Fight Back," reporting that "the protest on Tuesday barely registered. Wikipedia did not participate. Reddit ... added an inconspicuous banner to its homepage. Sites like Tumblr, Mozilla and DuckDuckGo, which were listed as organizers, did not include the banner on their homepages. The eight major technology companies—Google, Microsoft, Facebook, AOL, Apple, Twitter, Yahoo and LinkedIn ... only participated Tuesday insofar as having a joint website flash the protest banner."

== Notable participants ==
- ACLU
- Amnesty International
- AOL
- Demand Progress
- EFF
- Facebook
- Freedomworks
- Greenpeace
- Human Rights Watch
- LinkedIn
- Mozilla
- Reddit
- Restore the Fourth
- Tumblr
- Twitter
- Wikia
- Yahoo

== See also ==
- Stop Watching Us
- USA Freedom Act
