= Reactions to the Snowden disclosures =

The global surveillance disclosure released to media by Edward Snowden has caused tension in the bilateral relations of the United States with several of its allies and economic partners as well as in its relationship with the European Union. In August 2013, U.S. President Barack Obama announced the creation of "a review group on intelligence and communications technologies" that would brief and later report to him. In December, the task force issued 46 recommendations that, if adopted, would subject the National Security Agency (NSA) to additional scrutiny by the courts, Congress, and the president, and would strip the NSA of the authority to infiltrate American computer systems using "backdoors" in hardware or software. Geoffrey R. Stone, a White House panel member, said there was no evidence that the bulk collection of phone data had stopped any terror attacks.

U.S. Army General Keith B. Alexander, then director of the NSA, said in June 2013, "These leaks have caused significant and irreversible damage to our nation's security." He added that "the irresponsible release of classified information about these programs will have a long-term detrimental impact on the intelligence community's ability to detect future attacks."

In June 2014, Alexander's recently installed successor as the NSA's director, U.S. Navy Admiral Michael S. Rogers, said that while some terrorist groups had altered their communications to avoid surveillance techniques revealed by Snowden, the damage done overall did not lead him to conclude that "the sky is falling." Conceding there was no absolute protection against leaks by a dedicated insider with access to the agency's networks, Rogers said the NSA must nevertheless "ensure that the volume" of data taken by Snowden "can't be stolen again."

== Fallout ==
Shortly after the disclosures were published, President Obama asserted that the American public had no cause for concern because "nobody is listening to your telephone calls", and "there is no spying on Americans".

=== Allegations of false testimony ===
Excerpt of James Clapper's testimony before the Senate Select Committee on Intelligence

On June 21, 2013, the Director of National Intelligence James R. Clapper issued an apology for giving erroneous testimony under oath to the United States Congress. Earlier in March that year, Clapper was asked by Senator Ron Wyden to clarify the alleged surveillance of U.S. citizens by the NSA:

Senator Wyden: "Does the NSA collect any type of data at all on millions or hundreds of millions of Americans?"
Director Clapper: "No, Sir."

In an interview shortly after Snowden's disclosures were first published, Clapper stated that he had misunderstood Wyden's question and answered in what he thought was the "least untruthful manner". Later, in his letter of apology, Clapper wrote that he had only focused on Section 702 of the Foreign Intelligence Surveillance Act during his testimony to Congress, and therefore, he "simply didn't think" about Section 215 of the Patriot Act, which justifies the mass collection of telephone data from U.S. citizens. Clapper said: "My response was clearly erroneous—for which I apologize".

=== Declassification ===
Look, for the longest time I was in fear that I couldn't actually say the phrase "computer network attack". This stuff is hideously over-classified. And it gets into the way of a mature public discussion as to what it is that we as a democracy want our nation to be doing up here in the cyber domain.

— Former director of NSA and CIA, Michael Hayden.

To increase transparency and because it is in the public interest the Director of National Intelligence authorized the declassification and public release of the following documents pertaining to the collection of telephone metadata pursuant to Section 215 of the PATRIOT Act on July 31, 2013. These documents were:

1. Cover Letter and 2009 Report on the National Security Agency’s Bulk Collection Program for USA PATRIOT Act Reauthorization
2. Cover Letters and 2011 Report on the National Security Agency's Bulk Collection Program for USA PATRIOT Act Reauthorization
3. Primary Order for Business Records Collection Under Section 215 of the USA PATRIOT Act

On July 19, 2013, Human Rights Watch sent a letter to the Obama administration, urging it to allow companies involved in the NSA's surveillance to report about these activities and to increase government transparency.

=== Treatment of journalism ===
Press censorship

In June 2013, British government officials issued a confidential DA-Notice to several press organizations, with the aim of restricting their ability to report on these leaks. That same month, the United States Army barred its personnel from access to parts of the website of The Guardian after that site's publication of Snowden's leaks. The entire Guardian website was blocked for personnel stationed throughout Afghanistan, the Middle East, and South Asia.

According to a survey undertaken by the human rights group PEN International, these disclosures have had a chilling effect on American writers. Fearing the risk of being targeted by government surveillance, 28% of PEN's American members have curbed their usage of social media, and 16% have self-censored themselves by avoiding controversial topics in their writings.

Detention without charge

On August 18, 2013, David Miranda, partner of journalist Glenn Greenwald, was detained for nine hours under Schedule 7 of the United Kingdom's Terrorism Act of 2000. Miranda was returning from Berlin, carrying 58,000 GCHQ documents on a single computer file to Greenwald in Brazil. Greenwald described Miranda's detention as "clearly intended to send a message of intimidation to those of us who have been reporting on the NSA and GCHQ". The Metropolitan Police and Home Secretary Theresa May called Miranda's detention "legally and procedurally sound". However, Lord Falconer of Thoroton, who helped introduce the bill in the House of Lords, said that under the act, police can only detain someone "to assess whether they are involved in the commission, preparation or instigation of terrorism." He said, "I am very clear that this does not apply, either on its terms or in its spirit, to Mr Miranda." Antonio Patriota the Brazilian Minister of External Relations said that Miranda's detention was "not justifiable". The reasons for Miranda's detention were sought from the police by British politicians and David Anderson Q.C., the Independent Reviewer of Terrorism Legislation. The United States government later said that British officials had given them a "heads up" about Miranda's detention, while adding that the decision to detain him had been a British one.

Destruction of evidence

The Guardian editor Alan Rusbridger said the newspaper had received legal threats from the British government and was urged to surrender all documents leaked by Snowden. Security officials from the Government Communications Headquarters (GCHQ) later made a visit to the newspaper's London headquarters to ensure that all computer hard drives containing Snowden's documents were destroyed.

Editing of interview transcript

After the NSA Director of Compliance John Delong was interviewed by The Washington Post regarding these disclosures, the White House sent a "prepared" statement to The Post and ordered that "none of Delong's comments could be quoted on the record". The Post refused to comply.

Criminal investigation

A criminal investigation of these disclosures, by Britain's Metropolitan Police Service, was reported in November 2013.

Comments

On August 18, 2013, Amnesty International asserted that if journalists maintain their independence and report critically about governments, they too may be "targeted" by the British government.

On August 20, 2013, Index on Censorship argued that the British government's "threat of legal action" against The Guardian was a "direct attack on press freedom in the UK".

On September 4, 2013, U.N. Special Rapporteur Frank La Rue stressed that the "protection of national security secrets must never be used as an excuse to intimidate the press into silence."

=== Forced landing of Bolivian President Morales' plane ===
Five Latin American countries—Bolivia, Cuba, Ecuador, Nicaragua and Venezuela—voiced their concerns to the UN Secretary-General Ban Ki-moon after the plane of Bolivia's President Evo Morales was denied entry by a number of western European countries, and was forced to reroute to Austria based on "suspicion that United States whistleblower Edward Snowden was on board". Ban said it was important to prevent such incidents from occurring in the future and emphasized that "A Head of State and his or her aircraft enjoy immunity and inviolability".

=== Lavabit ===
On August 8, 2013, Lavabit, a Texas-based secure email service provider reportedly used by Snowden, abruptly announced it was shutting down operations after nearly 10 years of business. The owner, Ladar Levison, posted a statement online saying he would rather go out of business than "become complicit in crimes against the American people." He also said that he was barred by law from disclosing what he had experienced over the preceding 6 weeks, and that he was appealing the case in the U.S. Fourth Circuit Court of Appeals. Multiple sources speculated that the timing of the statement suggested that Lavabit had been targeted by the US government in its pursuit of information about Snowden. The following day, a similar email service, Silent Circle, preemptively shut down in order to "prevent spying". Snowden said about the Lavabit closure, "Ladar Levison and his team suspended the operations of their 10-year-old business rather than violate the Constitutional rights of their roughly 400,000 users. The President, Congress, and the Courts have forgotten that the costs of bad policy are always borne by ordinary citizens, and it is our job to remind them that there are limits to what we will pay." He said that "internet titans" like Google should ask themselves why they weren't "fighting for our interests the same way small businesses are."

=== Impact on trade ===
In March 2014, The New York Times reported that revelations of NSA spying had cost U.S. tech companies, including Microsoft and IBM, over $1 billion. A senior analyst at the Information Technology and Innovation Foundation said it was "clear to every single tech company that this is affecting their bottom line," and predicted that the U.S. cloud computing industry could lose $35 billion by 2016. Forrester Research, an independent technology and market research company, said losses could be as high as $180 billion, or 25 percent of industry revenue.

=== Allegations of adverse consequences for US and UK security ===
U.S. Army General Keith Alexander, then director of the NSA, said in June 2013, "These leaks have caused significant and irreversible damage to our nation's security." He added that "the irresponsible release of classified information about these programs will have a long-term detrimental impact on the intelligence community's ability to detect future attacks."

In August, Chairman of the Joint Chiefs of Staff Martin Dempsey said that Snowden "has caused us some considerable damage to our intelligence architecture. Our adversaries are changing the way that they communicate."

In October, former GCHQ director Sir David Omand, speaking of how useful for Russia's intelligence services Snowden's stay in Russia could be, told the BBC: "Part of me says that not even the KGB in its heyday of Philby, Burgess and Maclean in the 1950s could have dreamt of acquiring 58,000 highly classified intelligence documents." Snowden stated that he had not leaked any documents to Russia.

Also in October, Andrew Parker, director general of the UK Security Service, maintained that the exposing of intelligence techniques had given extremists the ability to evade the intelligence agencies; he said, "It causes enormous damage to make public the reach and limits of GCHQ techniques. Such information hands the advantage to the terrorists. It is the gift they need to evade us and strike at will."

That same month, the Financial Times editorialized that security chiefs were "right to be alarmed, knowing that terrorists can change their modus operandi in response to new information on their capabilities" and there was "no firm evidence that the intelligence agencies are using these new collection capabilities for malign ends."

== U.S. responses ==
=== Executive branch ===
On June 9, 2013, U.S. Director of National Intelligence James R. Clapper, referring to the surveillance activities lately reported in The Washington Post and The Guardian, stressed the activities were lawful, conducted under authorities approved by the U.S. Congress, and that "significant misimpressions" had resulted from the articles published; he called the disclosures of "intelligence community measures used to keep Americans safe" "reckless". He condemned the leaks as having done "huge, grave damage" to the U.S. intelligence capabilities.

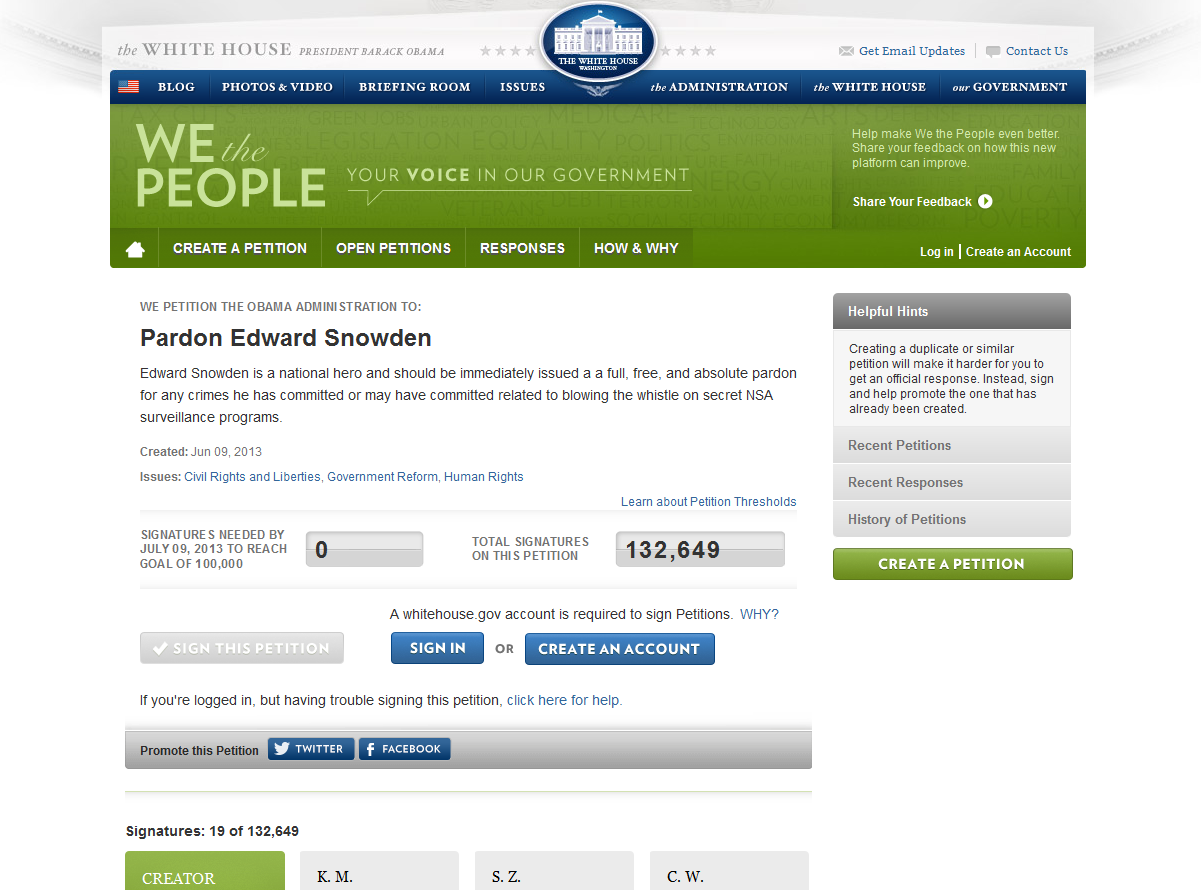
We the People petition to pardon Snowden at the White House website

That same day, a We the People petition was launched via the whitehouse.gov website seeking "a full, free and absolute pardon for any crimes [Snowden] has committed or may have committed related to blowing the whistle on secret NSA surveillance programs." The petition attained 100,000 signatures within two weeks, thus meeting the threshold and requiring an official response from the White House. The White House answered on July 28, 2015, declining to pardon Snowden. In a response written by Lisa Monaco, Obama's homeland security and terrorism advisor, the White House said Snowden's disclosures had severe consequences for national security and that he should come home to be judged by a jury of his peers.

Also in June 2013, the U.S. military blocked access to parts of The Guardian website related to government surveillance programs for thousands of defense personnel across the country, and to The Guardian's entire website for personnel stationed in Afghanistan, the Middle East, and South Asia. A spokesperson described the filtering as a routine "network hygiene" measure intended to mitigate unauthorized disclosures of classified information onto the Department of Defense's unclassified networks.

In August 2013, U.S. President Barack Obama said that he had called for a review of U.S. surveillance activities even before Snowden had begun revealing details of the NSA's operations. Obama announced that he was directing DNI Clapper "to establish a review group on intelligence and communications technologies" that would brief and later report to the president. In December, the task force issued 46 recommendations that, if adopted, would subject the NSA to additional scrutiny by the courts, Congress, and the president, and would strip the NSA of the authority to infiltrate American computer systems using "backdoors" in hardware or software. Panel member Geoffrey R. Stone said there was no evidence that the bulk collection of phone data had stopped any terror attacks.

On October 31, 2013, U.S. Secretary of State John Kerry stated that "in some cases" the NSA had "reached too far" in some of its surveillance activities, and promised that it would be stopped.

In January 2014, James Clapper gave public testimony to a session of the Senate Intelligence Committee. He asked that "Snowden and his accomplices" return the purloined NSA documents. When Clapper was asked whether the word "accomplices" referred to journalists, Clapper's spokesperson Shawn Turner responded, "Director Clapper was referring to anyone who is assisting Edward Snowden to further threaten our national security through the unauthorized disclosure of stolen documents related to lawful foreign intelligence collection programs."

Also in January 2014, a review by the Privacy and Civil Liberties Oversight Board (PCLOB) concluded that the NSA's collection of every U.S. phone record on a daily basis violates the legal restrictions of the statute cited to authorize it. "The Section 215 bulk telephone records program," PCLOB reported, "lacks a viable legal foundation under Section 215 [of the Patriot Act], implicates constitutional concerns under the First and Fourth Amendments, raises serious threats to privacy and civil liberties as a policy matter, and has shown only limited value. As a result, the Board recommends that the government end the program." The White House rejected the findings, saying "We simply disagree with the board's analysis on the legality of the program." A second PCLOB review, in July 2014, concluded that the NSA's surveillance program targeting foreigners overseas is lawful, under Section 702 of the FISA Amendments Act of 2008, and effective but that certain elements push "close to the line" of being unconstitutional. The July report said that the Board was "impressed with the rigor of the government’s efforts to ensure that it acquires only those communications it is authorized to collect, and that it targets only those persons it is authorized to target. Moreover, the government has taken seriously its obligations to establish and adhere to a detailed set of rules regarding how it handles U.S. person communications that it acquires under the program."

=== Congress ===
Reactions to the global surveillance disclosures among members of the U.S. Congress initially were largely negative. Speaker of the House John Boehner and senators Dianne Feinstein and Bill Nelson called Snowden a traitor, and several senators and representatives joined them in calling for Snowden's arrest and prosecution. Arizona Senator John McCain criticized politicians who voted in favor of the PATRIOT Act but were outraged by the NSA spying on phone calls by saying, "We passed the Patriot Act. We passed specific provisions of the act that allowed for this program to take place, to be enacted in operation. Now, if members of Congress did not know what they were voting on, then I think that that's their responsibility a lot more than it is the government's."

In July 2013, the U.S. Senate Committee on Appropriations unanimously adopted an amendment by Senator Lindsey Graham to the "Fiscal Year 2014 Department of State, Foreign Operations, and Related Programs Appropriations Bill" that would have sought sanctions against any country offering asylum to Snowden.

Also in July 2013, Rep. Justin Amash (R-Mich.) and Rep. John Conyers (D-Mich.) proposed the "Amash–Conyers Amendment" to the National Defense Authorization Act. If passed, the amendment would have curtailed "the ongoing dragnet collection and storage of the personal records of innocent Americans." The House rejected the amendment by a vote of 205–217. An analysis indicated that those who voted against the amendment received 122% more in campaign contributions from defense contractors than those who voted in favor.

In September 2013, Senators Mark Udall, Richard Blumenthal, Rand Paul and Ron Wyden introduced a "sweeping surveillance reform" proposal. Called the most comprehensive proposal to date, the "Intelligence Oversight and Surveillance Reform Act" seeks to end the bulk collection of communication records made legal in section 215 of the Patriot Act and to reign in other "electronic eavesdropping programs". Wyden told The Guardian the Snowden disclosures have "caused a sea change in the way the public views the surveillance system". The draft bill is a blend of 12 similar proposals as well as other legislative proposals.

In October 2013, Congressman Jim Sensenbrenner, author of the Patriot Act, introduced a proposal to the House of Representatives called the USA Freedom Act to end the bulk collection of Americans' metadata and reform the Foreign Intelligence Surveillance Act (FISA) court. Senators introduced two different reform proposals. One, the USA Freedom Act (H.R. 3361/ S. 1599), would effectively halt “bulk” records collection under the USA Patriot Act, while it also would require a warrant to deliberately search for the e-mail and phone call content of Americans that is collected as part of a surveillance program targeting foreigners located overseas. Another proposal is the FISA Improvements Act that would preserve the program while strengthening privacy protections. It would also codify the requirement that analysts 'have a “reasonable articulable suspicion” that a phone number is associated with terrorism' in order to query the NSA phone records database; require that the FISA court promptly review each such determination, and limit the retention period for phone records. Both proposals call for the introduction of a special advocate to promote privacy interests before the FISA court.

=== Judiciary ===
In April 2014, The Washington Post reported that some federal judges holding low-level positions had been balking at sweeping requests by law enforcement for cellphone and other sensitive personal data. The Post called it "a small but growing faction, including judges in Texas, Kansas, New York and Pennsylvania," and said the judges deemed the requests overly broad and at odds with basic constitutional rights. Although some rulings were overturned, said the Post, their decisions have shaped when and how investigators can seize information detailing the locations, communications and online histories of Americans. Albert Gidari Jr., a partner at Perkins Coie who represents technology and telecommunications companies, told the Post that these judges "don't want to be the ones who approve an order that later becomes public and embarrassing…. Nobody likes to be characterized as a rubber stamp." According to the Post, some legal observers have called this "the Magistrates' Revolt," which began several years ago; however, it gained power amid mounting public anger about government surveillance capabilities after the NSA disclosures.

==== Lawsuits ====
In the wake of the NSA leaks, conservative public interest lawyer and Judicial Watch founder Larry Klayman filed a lawsuit claiming that the federal government had unlawfully collected metadata for his telephone calls and was harassing him (see Klayman v. Obama), and the American Civil Liberties Union (ACLU) filed a lawsuit against Director of National Intelligence James Clapper alleging that the NSA's phone records program was unconstitutional (see ACLU v. Clapper). Once the judge in each case had issued rulings seemingly at odds with one another, Gary Schmitt (former staff director of the Senate Select Committee on Intelligence) wrote in The Weekly Standard, "The two decisions have generated public confusion over the constitutionality of the NSA's data collection program—a kind of judicial 'he-said, she-said' standoff."

=== State governments ===
In 2014, legislators in several USA states introduced bills based upon a model act, written by anti-surveillance activists, called the "Fourth Amendment Protection Act". The bills seek to prohibit the respective state government from co-operating with the NSA in various ways: the Utah bill would prohibit provision of water to NSA facilities; the California bill would prohibit state universities from conducting research for the NSA; and the Kansas bill would require a search warrant for data collection.

=== Public protests ===
==== "Restore the Fourth" ====
After the June 2013 release, a political movement known as "Restore the Fourth" was formed in the United States and rapidly gained momentum. In early July, Restore the Fourth was responsible for protests in more than 80 cities including Seattle, San Francisco, Denver, Chicago, Los Angeles and New York City. These protests were loosely coordinated via online messaging services and involved protesters from all over the United States.

==== "Stop Watching Us" ====
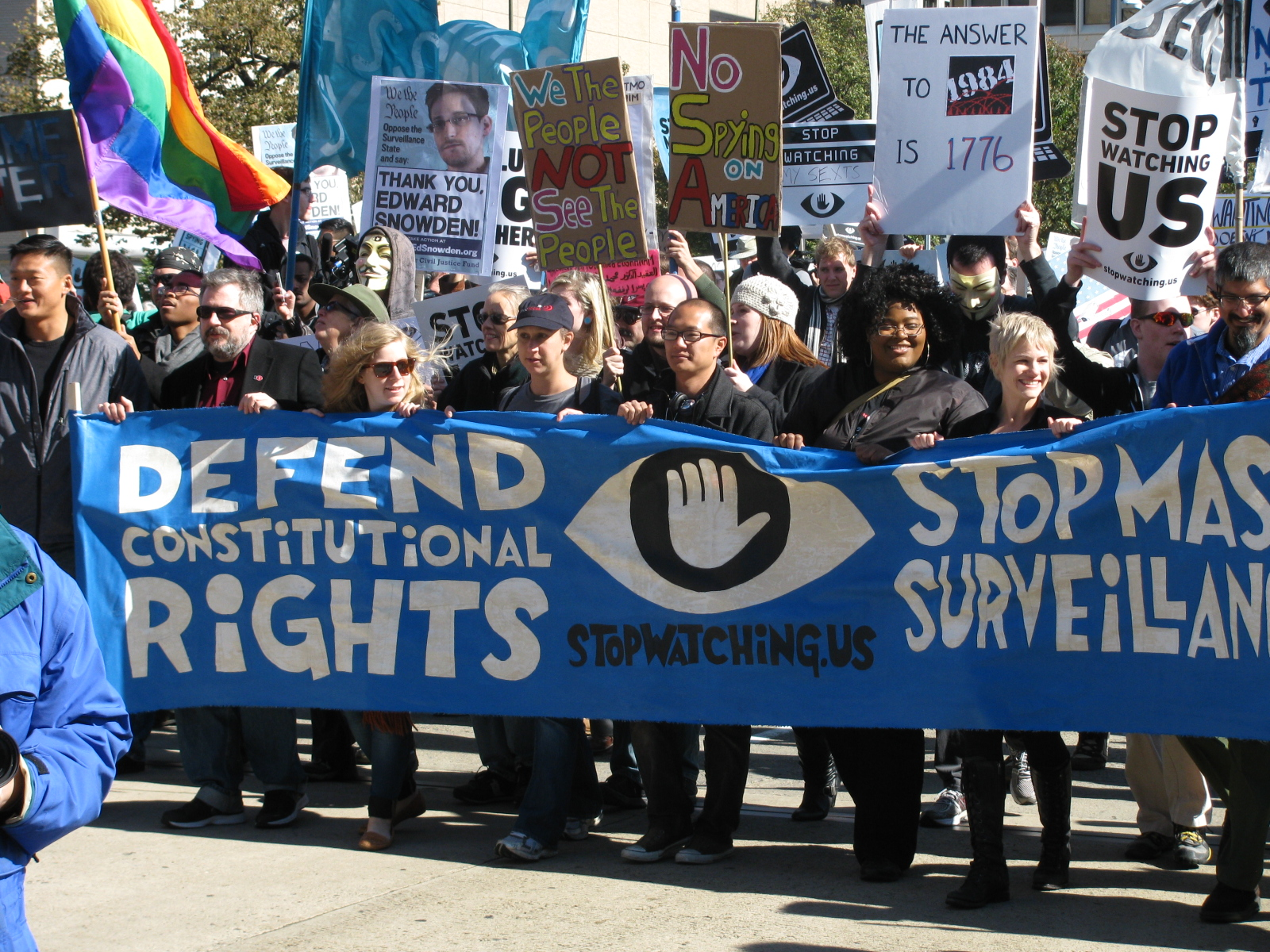
"Stop Watching US" rally in Washington DC, October 26, 2013

On October 26, 2013, an anti-NSA rally called "Stop Watching Us" was held in Washington, D.C., billed by organizers as the "largest rally yet to protest mass surveillance". A diverse coalition of over 100 advocacy groups organized the event and attracted thousands of protesters calling for an end to mass surveillance. Speakers included former governor Gary Johnson and NSA whistleblower Thomas Drake.

==== "The Day We Fight Back" ====
"The Day We Fight Back" was a protest against mass surveillance by the National Security Agency (NSA) on February 11, 2014. The 'day of action' primarily took the form of webpage banner-advertisements urging viewers to contact their lawmakers over issues surrounding cyber surveillance and a free Internet. By February 10, more than 5,700 websites and organizations had signed up to show support by featuring The Day We Fight Back banners for 24 hours.

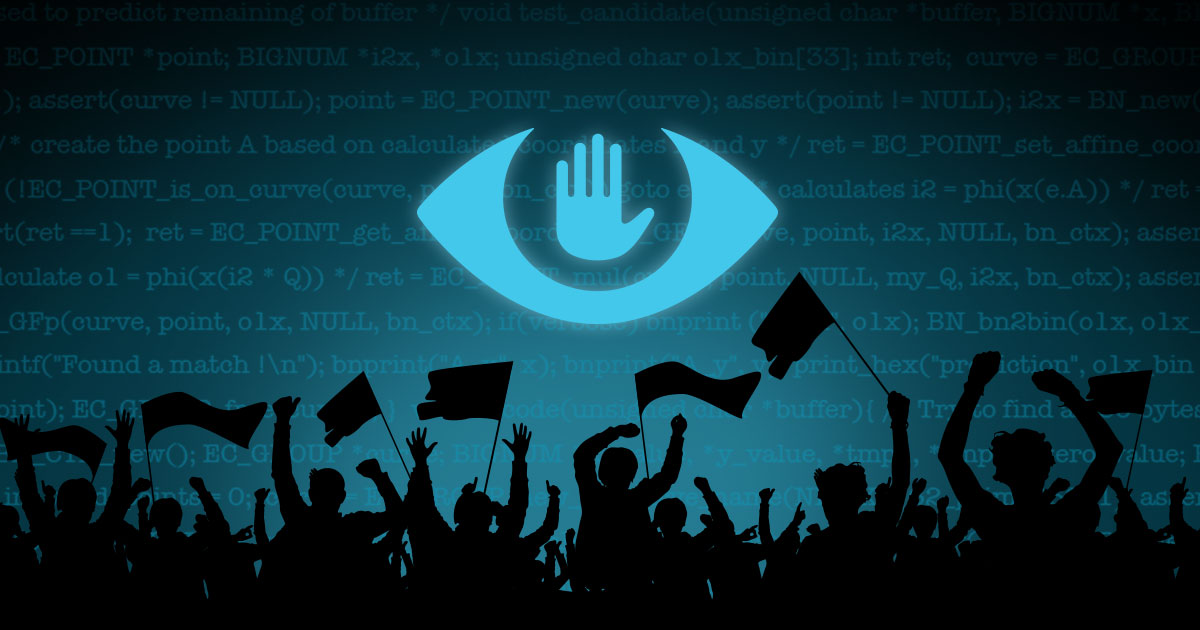
The banner of The Day We Fight Back, February 11, 2014

As February 11 drew to a close, The New York Times posted a blog titled "The Day the Internet Didn't Fight Back," reporting that "the protest on Tuesday barely registered. Wikipedia did not participate. Reddit … added an inconspicuous banner to its homepage. Sites like Tumblr, Mozilla and DuckDuckGo, which were listed as organizers, did not include the banner on their homepages. The eight major technology companies —Google, Microsoft, Facebook, AOL, Apple, Twitter, Yahoo and LinkedIn— only participated Tuesday insofar as having a joint website flash the protest banner.

=== Non-government organization ===
An analysis released by the New America Foundation in January 2014 reviewed 225 terrorism cases since the September 11 attacks found that the NSA's bulk collection of phone records "has had no discernible impact on preventing acts of terrorism," and that U.S. government claims of the program's usefulness were "overblown."

== International response ==
=== Asia ===
==== China ====
On June 17, 2013, nearly two weeks after the first disclosure was published, Chinese Foreign Ministry spokeswoman Hua Chunying said at a daily briefing, "We believe the United States should pay attention to the international community's concerns and demands and give the international community the necessary explanation."

===== Hong Kong =====
The South China Morning Post published a poll of Hong Kong residents conducted while Snowden was still in Hong Kong that showed that half of the 509 respondents believed the Chinese government should not surrender Snowden to the United States if Washington raises such a request; 33 percent of those polled think of Snowden as a hero, 12.8 percent described him as a traitor, 36 percent said he was neither.

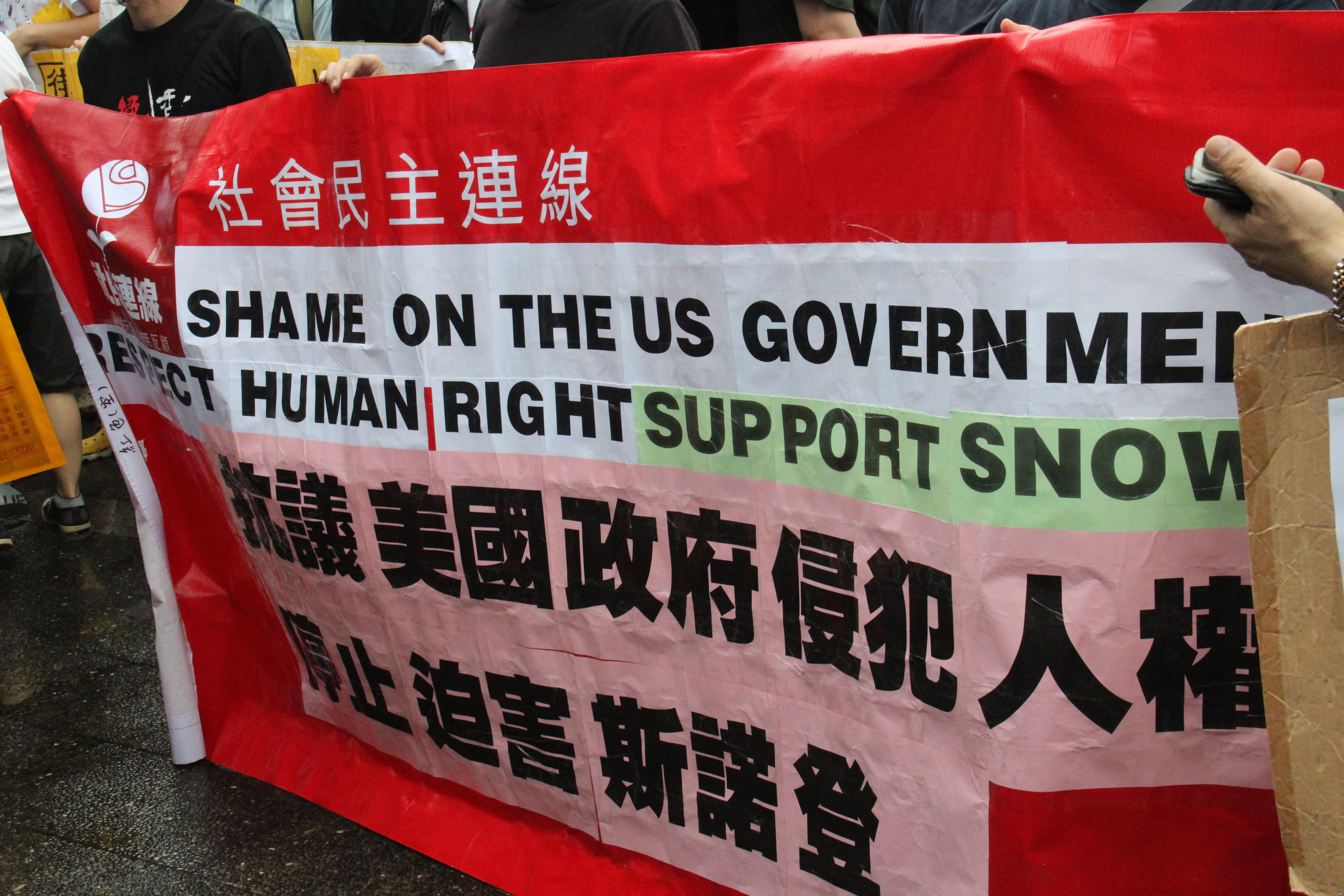
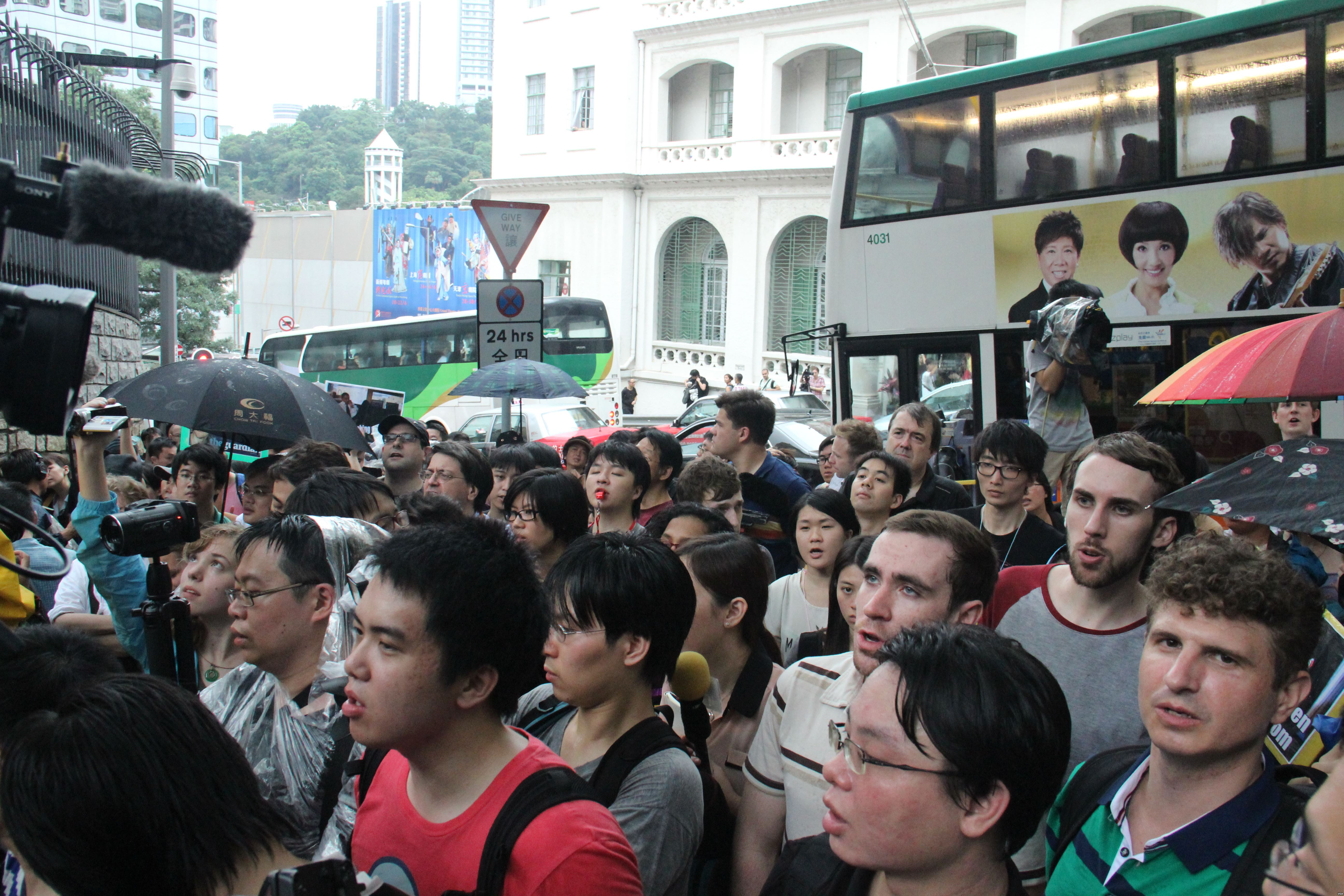
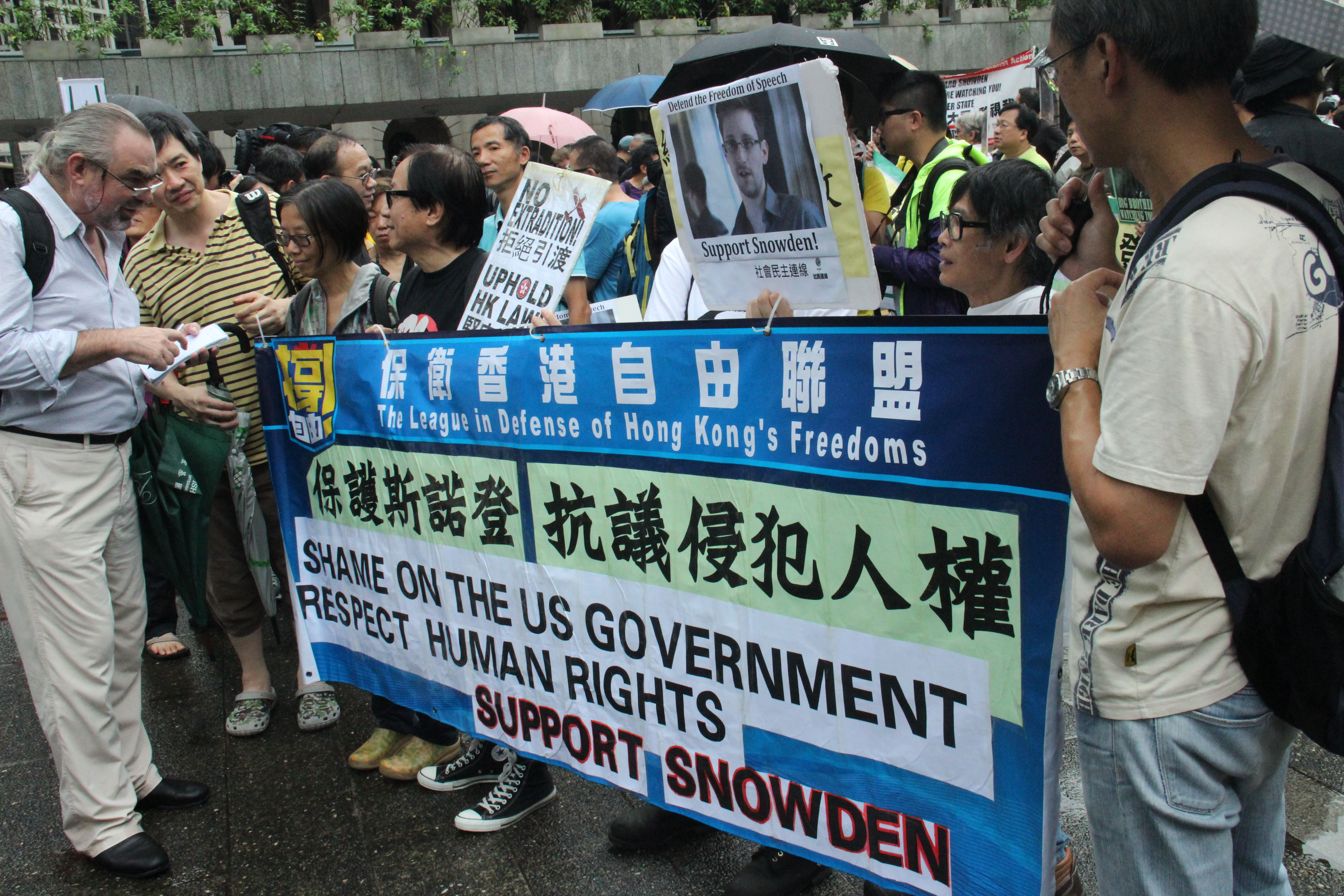
Hong Kong demonstration at US Consulate on June 15 in support of Snowden

Referring to Snowden's presence in the territory, Hong Kong chief executive Leung Chun-Ying assured that the government would "handle the case of Mr Snowden in accordance with the laws and established procedures of Hong Kong [and] follow up on any incidents related to the privacy or other rights of the institutions or people in Hong Kong being violated." Pan-democrat legislators Gary Fan and Claudia Mo said that the perceived U.S. prosecution against Snowden will set "a dangerous precedent and will likely be used to justify similar actions" by authoritarian governments. During Snowden's stay, the two main political groups, the pan-democrats and Pro-Beijing camp, found rare agreement to support Snowden. The pro-Beijing DAB party even organised a separate march to Government headquarters for Snowden.

The People's Daily and the Global Times editorials of June 19 stated respectively that the central Chinese government was unwilling to be involved in a "mess" caused by others, and that the Hong Kong government should follow the public opinion and not concern itself with Sino-US relations. A Tsinghua University communications studies specialist, Liu Jianming, interpreted the two articles as suggesting that the mainland government did not want further involvement in the case and that the Hong Kong government should handle it independently.

After Snowden left Hong Kong, Chinese-language newspapers such as the Ming Pao and the Oriental Daily expressed relief that Hong Kong no longer had to shoulder the burden of the Snowden situation. Mainland experts said that, although the Central Government did not want to appear to be intervening in the matter, it was inconceivable that the Hong Kong government acted independently in a matter that could have far-reaching consequences for Sino-US relations. One expert suggested that, by doing so, China had "returned the favor" for their not having accepted the asylum plea from Wang Lijun in February 2012. The official Chinese Communist Party mouthpiece, the People's Daily denied the US government accusation that the PRC central government had allowed Snowden to escape, and said that Snowden helped in "tearing off Washington's sanctimonious mask."

==== Malaysia ====
On November 2, 2013, the Malaysian Foreign Minister Anifah Aman summoned the ambassadors of Australia and the United States to protest an alleged American-led spying network in Asia.

=== Europe ===
==== European Union ====
Early in July 2013, the European Commissioner for Home Affairs, Cecilia Malmström, wrote to two U.S. officials that "mutual trust and confidence have been seriously eroded and I expect the U.S. to do all that it can to restore them".

On October 20, 2013, a committee at the European Parliament backed a measure that, if enacted, would require American companies to seek clearance from European officials before complying with United States warrants seeking private data. The legislation has been under consideration for two years. The vote is part of efforts in Europe to shield citizens from online surveillance in the wake of revelations about a far-reaching spying program by NSA.

The European Council meeting at the end of October 2013 in its statement signed by all 28 EU leaders while stressing that "intelligence gathering is a vital element in the fight against terrorism" and noting "the close relationship between Europe and the USA and the value of that partnership", said that this must "be based on respect and trust," a lack of which "could prejudice the necessary cooperation in the field of intelligence gathering".

On December 23, 2013, the European Parliament released the results of its inquiry into the NSA activities. "The European Parliament's committee inquiry into the spying scandal," Deutsche Welle reported, "was the first of this scale. No individual EU country has looked into the scandal this thoroughly and no EU government has been as explicit in its criticism of the US government." The draft report covered the preceding six months and was, said Deutsche Welle, "hard on all sides—including governments and companies in the EU." Presented by Claude Moraes, British Member of the European Parliament from the Progressive Alliance of Socialists and Democrats, the report found what it called "compelling evidence of the existence of far-reaching, complex and highly technologically advanced systems designed by US and some Member States' intelligence services to collect, store and analyze communication and location data and metadata of all citizens around the world on an unprecedented scale and in an indiscriminate and non-suspicion-based manner." The fight against terrorism, said the report, can "never in itself be a justification for untargeted, secret and sometimes even illegal mass surveillance programs." Moraes and his fellow rapporteurs considered it "very doubtful that data collection of such magnitude is only guided by the fight against terrorism, as it involves the collection of all possible data of all citizens; points therefore to the possible existence of other power motives such as political and economic espionage."

==== France ====
On October 21, 2013, France summoned Charles Rivkin, the U.S. Ambassador to France, to clarify and explain the NSA's surveillance of French citizens. Speaking to journalists, President François Hollande said, "We cannot accept this kind of behaviour between partners and allies. We ask that this immediately stop." According to The Wall Street Journal, data allegedly collected by the NSA in France was actually collected by French intelligence agencies outside France and then shared with the United States.

==== Germany ====
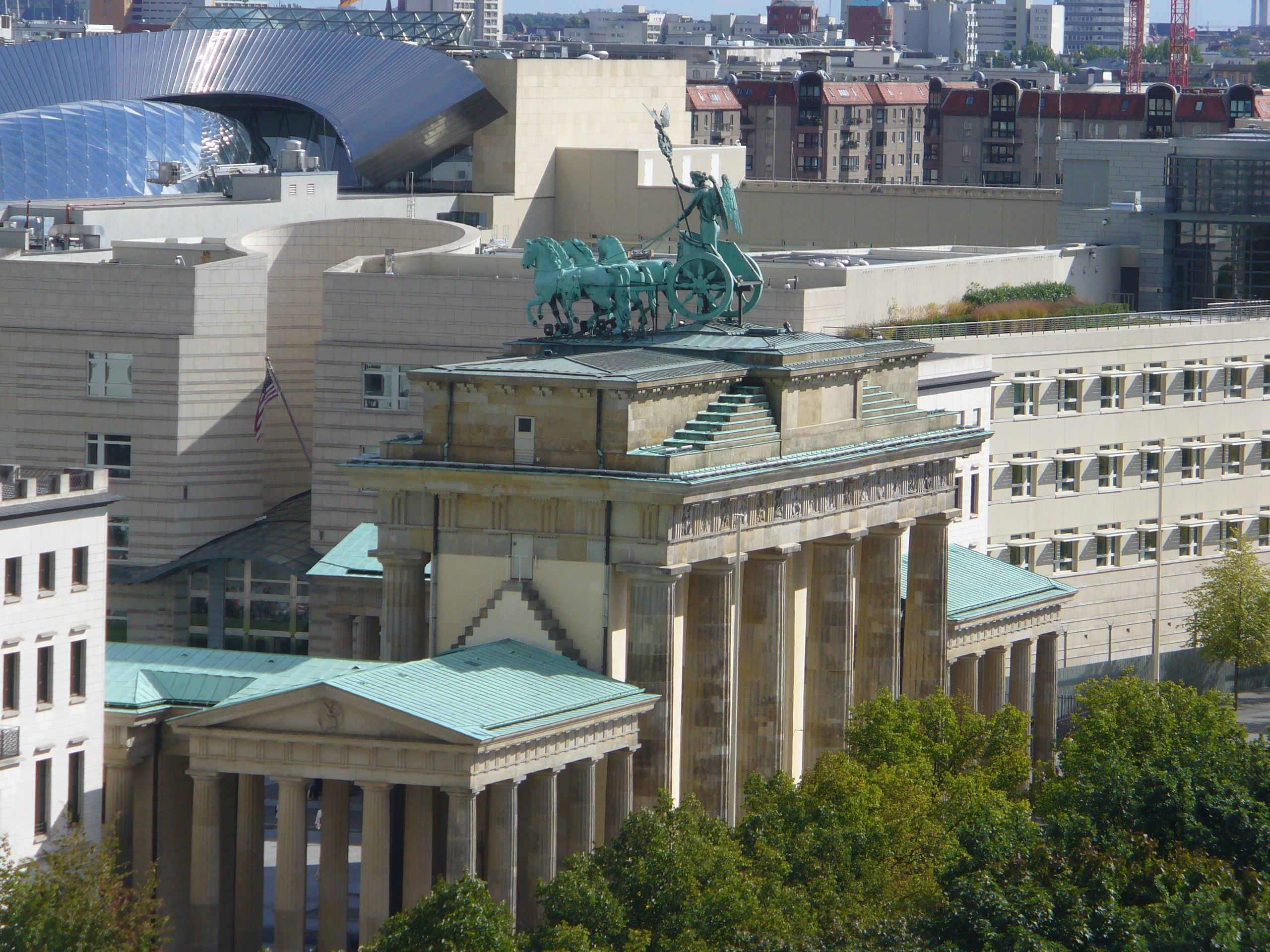
A view from the rooftop terrace of the Reichstag building in Berlin, the seat of the German parliament. In the background, behind the Brandenburg Gate, the United States Embassy can be seen. The grey structure on the embassy's roof (top right corner of the photograph) is thought to contain surveillance equipment, possibly used to tap into mobile phones.

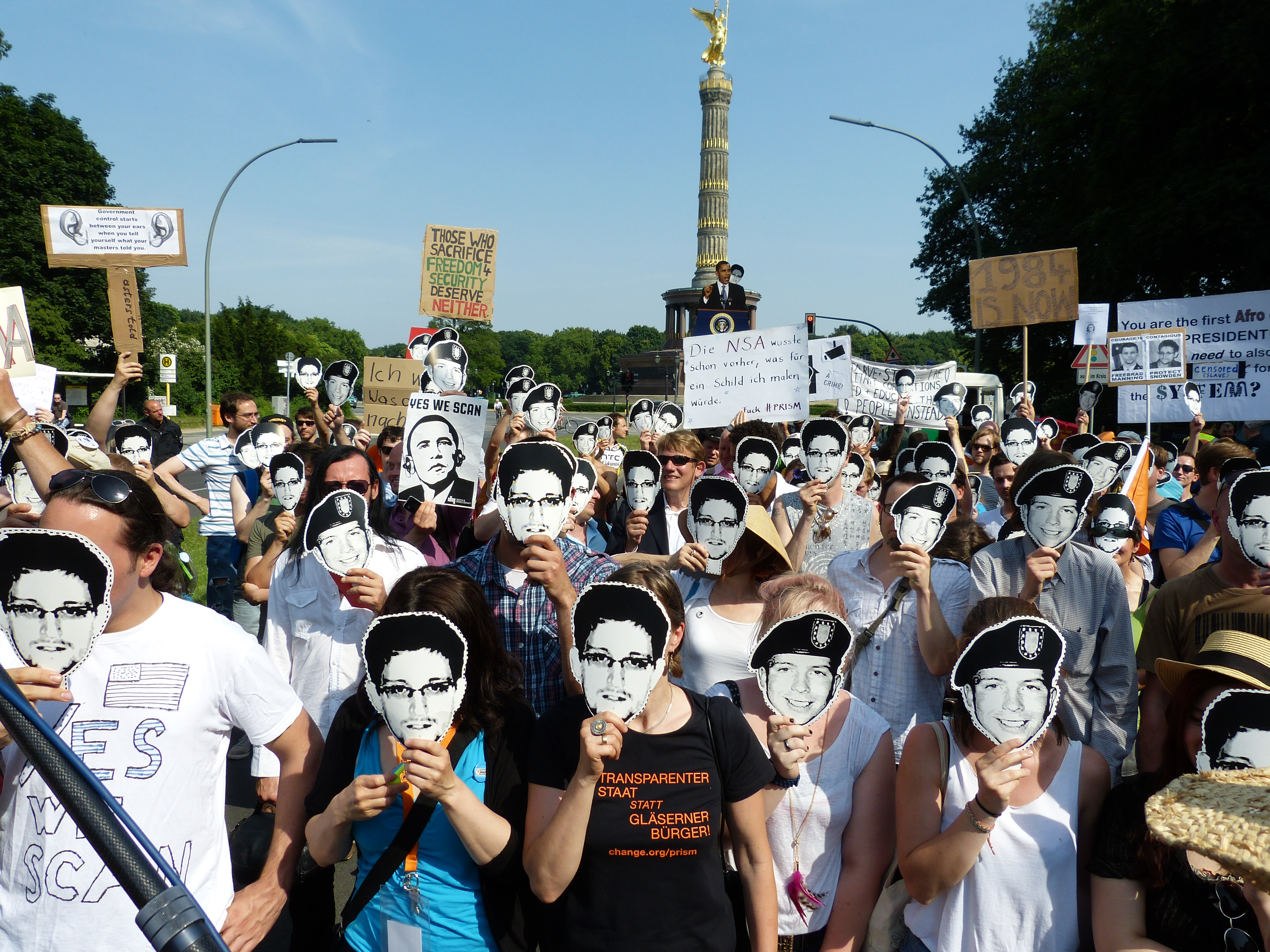
Demonstration of the Pirate Party of Germany against PRISM in Berlin, Germany, 2013

According to The Wall Street Journal, "The outcry over NSA eavesdropping has been most pronounced in Germany, a country whose history of dictatorship has left the population particularly sensitive to violations of personal privacy." It was revealed that, beginning in 2002, German Chancellor Angela Merkel’s phone has been on an NSA target list.

On July 1, 2013, the German Foreign Ministry summoned Philip D. Murphy, the U.S. Ambassador to Germany, over allegations that the NSA had spied on institutions of the European Union.

In early August 2013, Germany canceled largely symbolic Cold War-era administrative agreements with Britain, the United States and France, which had granted the Western countries which had troops stationed in West Germany the right to request surveillance operations to protect those forces. At the end of August, under the orders of the German domestic intelligence agency, a federal police helicopter conducted a low-altitude flyover of the United States Consulate in Frankfurt, apparently in search of suspected clandestine eavesdropping facilities. A German official called it a symbolic "shot across the bow."

On October 24, 2013, EU heads of state met to discuss a proposed data protection law. The representatives of Italy, Poland and France wanted the law to be passed before the May 2014 European Parliament elections. Germany, represented by Angela Merkel, and the UK, represented by David Cameron, favored a slower implementation; their wishes prevailed. About the "Five Eyes" espionage alliance, Merkel remarked, "Unlike David, we are unfortunately not part of this group." Also on October 24, the Foreign Ministry summoned John B. Emerson, the U.S. Ambassador to Germany, to clarify allegations that the NSA had tapped into Chancellor Angela Merkel’s mobile phone.

While the German government had hoped for a "no spy" agreement with the U.S., by January 2014 it was reported that Germany had "given up hope" of securing such a treaty. The Foreign Office's Philipp Mißfelder declared that "the current situation in transatlantic relations is worse than it was at the low-point in 2003 during the Iraq War".

The German Parliamentary Committee investigating the NSA spying scandal was started on March 20, 2014, by the German Parliament in order to investigate the extent and background of foreign secret services spying in Germany and to search for strategies on how to protect German telecommunication with technical means.

It was revealed that Germany's BND intelligence service has covertly monitored European defence interests and politicians inside Germany at the request of the NSA.

==== Italy ====
Italy's Prime Minister Enrico Letta asked John Kerry, the U.S. Secretary of State, to clarify if the NSA had illegally intercepted telecommunications in Italy. On October 23, 2013, the Italian Interior Minister Angelino Alfano told reporters, "We have a duty to [provide] clarity to Italian citizens—we must obtain the whole truth and tell the whole truth, without regard for anyone."

==== Spain ====
On October 25, 2013, the Spanish Prime Minister Mariano Rajoy summoned James Costos, the U.S. Ambassador to Spain, to clarify reports about the NSA's surveillance of the Spanish government. Spanish EU Minister Íñigo Méndez de Vigo said such practices, if true, were "inappropriate and unacceptable". An EU delegation was to meet officials in Washington to convey their concerns. According to The Wall Street Journal, data allegedly collected by the NSA in Spain was actually collected by Spanish intelligence agencies outside Spain and then shared with the United States. On October 29, The Washington Post reported that an anonymous "senior Obama administration official" had also described such an arrangement with Spain.

==== UK ====
British Foreign Minister William Hague admitted that Britain's GCHQ was also spying and collaborating with the NSA, and defended the two agencies' actions as "indispensable." British Prime Minister David Cameron issued a veiled threat to resort to prior restraint, through high court injunctions and DA-Notices, if The Guardian did not obey his demands to stop reporting its revelations on spying by GCHQ and the NSA, a development that "alarmed" the Committee to Protect Journalists and spurred 70 of the world's leading human rights organizations to write an open letter to the newspaper expressing their concern about press and other freedoms in the UK.

In 2014 the Director of GCHQ authored an article in the Financial Times on the topic of internet surveillance, stating that "however much [large US technology companies] may dislike it, they have become the command and control networks of choice for terrorists and criminals" and that GCHQ and its sister agencies "cannot tackle these challenges at scale without greater support from the private sector", arguing that most internet users "would be comfortable with a better and more sustainable relationship between the [intelligence] agencies and the tech companies". Since the 2013 surveillance disclosures, large US technology companies have improved security and become less co-operative with foreign intelligence agencies, including those of the UK, generally requiring a US court order before disclosing data.

=== North America ===
==== Mexico ====
On October 24, 2013, the Mexican Foreign Minister José Antonio Meade Kuribreña met with U.S. Ambassador Earl Anthony Wayne to discuss allegations reported by Der Spiegel that the NSA hacked the emails of former president Felipe Calderón while in office.

=== Australia ===
Former Foreign Minister Bob Carr remarked that the U.S. would be critical of any other nation that failed to prevent the release of such sensitive documents. "Certainly if it had gone the other way," said Carr, "if there'd been some official in Canberra, some contractor in Canberra, who allowed a slew of material as sensitive as this to be plastered over the world's media, America would be saying very stern things to someone they'd be regarding as a woefully immature ally and partner."

==== Indonesia ====
On November 1, 2013, the Foreign Ministry of Indonesia summoned Australia's Ambassador Greg Moriarty to explain his country's surveillance of President Susilo Bambang Yudhoyono and other Indonesian political leaders. On November 18, the Australian ambassador was summoned again by Indonesian government officials, who pledged to review all types of cooperation with Australia. The Indonesian Foreign Minister Marty Natalegawa called the spying "unacceptable", and added that "This is an unfriendly, unbecoming act between strategic partners." The Indonesian ambassador to Australia was also recalled as a response to the incident.

=== South America ===
==== Brazil ====
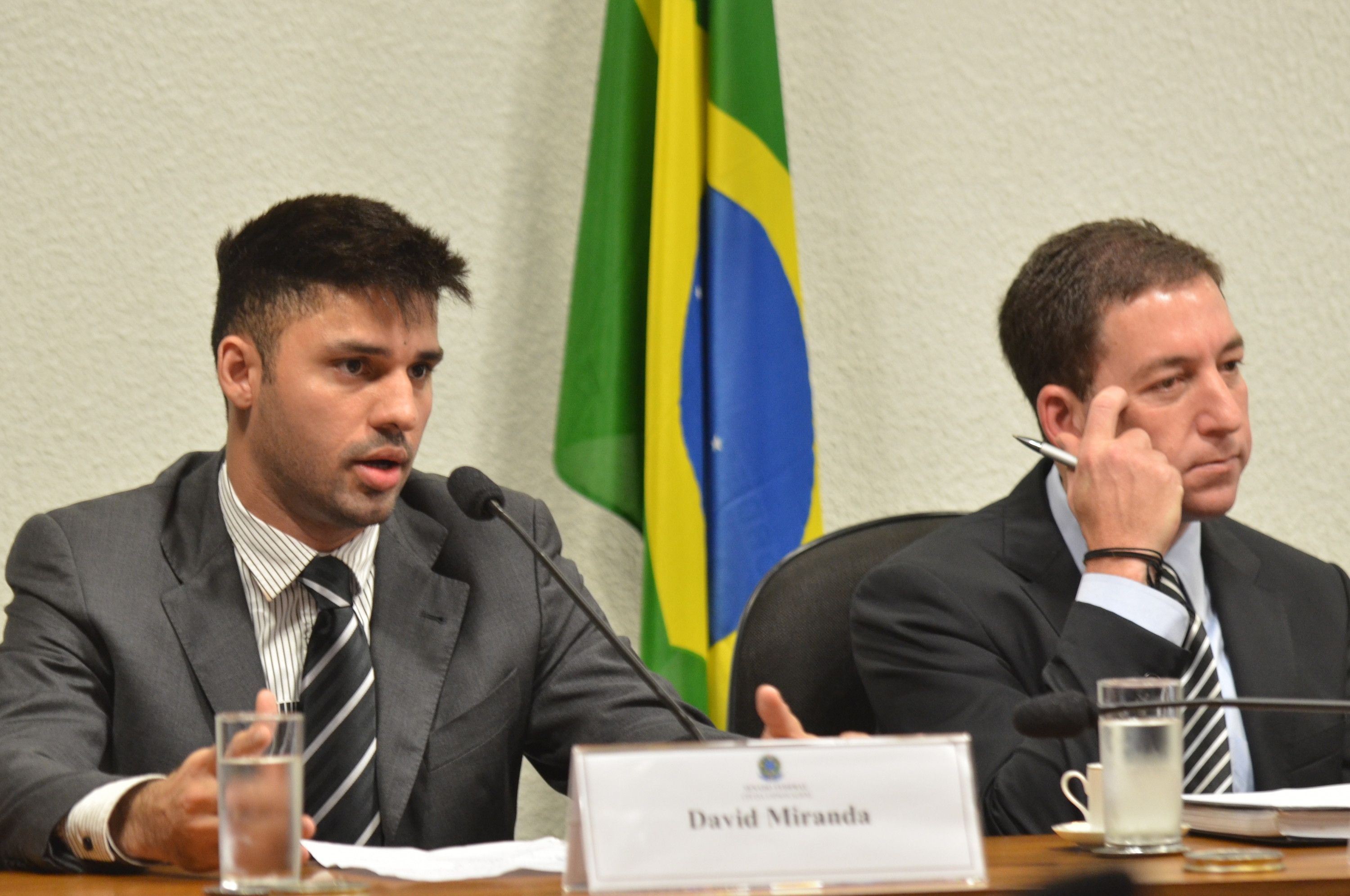
Glenn Greenwald (right) and his partner, Brazilian David Miranda (left), speaking to the National Congress of Brazil about U.S. spying activity in that country.

The Brazilian government expressed outrage at the revelations that the National Security Agency directly targeted the communications of president Dilma Rousseff and her top aides. It called the incident an "unacceptable violation of sovereignty" and requested an immediate explanation from the U.S. government.

Brazil's government signaled it would consider cancelling Rousseff's state visit to Washington—the only state visit for a foreign leader scheduled this year. A senior Brazilian official stated the country would downgrade commercial ties unless Rousseff received a public apology. That would include ruling out the $4 billion purchase of Boeing F-18 Super Hornet fighters and cooperation on oil and biofuels technology, as well as other commercial agreements. Petrobras announced that it was investing R$21 billion over five years to improve its data security.

==== Ecuador ====
Ecuador responded by renouncing U.S. trade benefits and offering to pay a similar amount, $23 million per year, to finance human rights training in America to help avoid what Ecuador's Foreign Minister Ricardo Patiño called "violations of privacy, torture and other actions that are denigrating to humanity."

=== Other countries ===
Russia, South Africa, and Turkey reacted angrily after it was revealed that their diplomats had been spied on during the 2009 G-20 London summit.

=== Non-government organizations ===
==== Index on Censorship ====
London-based Index on Censorship called upon the U.S. government to uphold the First Amendment, saying, "The mass surveillance of citizens' private communications is unacceptable—it both invades privacy and threatens freedom of expression. The US government cannot use the excuse of national security to justify either surveillance on this scale or the extradition of Snowden for revealing it."

==== United Nations ====
In July 2013, speaking to the foreign affairs committee of the Icelandic Parliament in Reykjavík, UN Secretary-General Ban Ki-moon said that in his personal opinion, Edward Snowden had misused his right to digital access and created problems that outweigh the benefits of public disclosure. Birgitta Jónsdóttir, an Icelandic legislator who in 2010 assisted WikiLeaks in publishing U.S. state secrets leaked by Chelsea Manning, expressed alarm at Ban's remarks. She said that he "seemed entirely unconcerned about the invasion of privacy by governments around the world, and only concerned about how whistleblowers are misusing the system."

== In popular culture ==
In The Blacklist episode "The Alchemist (No. 101)" (season 1, episode 12, minutes 00:22:00-00:22:55), one of the technical experts Red tasked to reconstitute documents shredded by American governmental agencies reports: "We actually reached out to the Germans for help. They're the ones who designed the software." Red replies: "Ah, the Germans. Despite recent headlines, they're still the best at keeping an eye on their fellow man".

== See also ==
- Barack Obama on mass surveillance
