= CIA activities by country =

The Central Intelligence Agency (CIA) is an agency of the federal government of the United States that has carried out numerous confirmed and alleged activities across the world since its founding in 1947.

== Africa ==
=== Angola ===
During the Angolan Civil War, the CIA supported UNITA against the communist MPLA as part of Operation IA Feature, funding UNITA with $32 million in cash and $16 million in weapons.

=== Chad ===
Throughout the 1980s, the CIA supported dictator of Chad Hissène Habré as a counter to dictator of Libya Muammar Gaddafi. Habré later went to trial in 2015 in Senegal for crimes against humanity, torture and war crimes.

=== Libya ===
During the war on terror, the CIA and British MI6 cooperated with the Gaddafi regime. This included renditions of Libyan dissidents back to Gaddafi's regime, where they were often tortured. This was exposed from documents found in Tripoli during the 2011 Libyan Revolution.

=== Niger ===
In 2018, a CIA drone base near Dirkou operating out of a small commercial airport was revealed by The New York Times.

=== Somalia ===
The CIA has been alleged to have influenced the 1967 elections by financing Prime Minister Muhammad Haji Ibrahim Egal and other pro-western leaders. In 2003, the CIA began to covertly arm and finance Somali warlords opposed to the Islamic Courts Union (ICU). From the CIA station in Nairobi, Kenya, agents would make frequent trips to Mogadishu by plane where they would pay hundreds of thousands of dollars to the warlords. The CIAs policy was evaluated as a failure, due to the ICU continuing to hold power. During the subsequent Ethiopian invasion of Somalia, the Bush administration expressed doubts about Ethiopia's ability to effectively use the new equipment it had been provided for the operation, prompting the further involvement of CIA agents. CIA paramilitary officers participated in combat alongside the Ethiopian military from the outset of operations against the Islamic Courts Union.

Alongside funding proxy wars in Somalia, the CIA has also financed a secret prison in Mogadishu, run by the Somali National Security Agency (now the National Intelligence and Security Agency), but entirely reliant on the United States. According to Somali government officials, American agents operate unilaterally in the country.

=== South Africa ===
Former CIA agent and US diplomat Donald Rickard has claimed that the CIA helped arrest Nelson Mandela by informing South African police of his location in 1962, leading to the Rivona Trial and imprisonment until 1990. This was due to his association with South African communists. In a 2016 article, the African National Congress claimed CIA interference in South Africa was ongoing.

== Americas ==
=== Brazil ===
The CIA and the United States government were involved in the 1964 Brazilian coup d'état. The coup occurred from March 31 to April 1, which resulted in the Brazilian Armed Forces ousting President João Goulart. The United States saw Goulart as a left-wing threat in Latin America. Secret cables written by the US Ambassador to Brazil, Lincoln Gordon, confirmed that the CIA was involved in covert action in Brazil. The CIA encouraged "pro-democracy street rallies" in Brazil, for instance, to create dissent against Goulart.

=== Guatemala ===
The CIA has carried out a number of interventions in Guatemala, including:

- 1952: Operation PBFortune, a failed attempt to overthrow the democratically elected leader Jacobo Árbenz
- 1954: Operation PBSuccess, which overthrew Árbenz and led to decades of military rule in Guatemala
- 1954: Operation PBHistory, an attempt to prove a link between Árbenz and communism, while monitoring Latin American communists

Throughout the Guatemalan Civil War, the CIA trained the Guatemalan military, including during the Guatemalan genocide.

PBSuccess has been noted for radicalising Che Guevara towards Marxism.

=== Nicaragua ===
The CIA armed the Contras against the Sandinista government in the aftermath of the Nicaraguan Revolution from 1981 to 1990. This was hugely controversial due to human rights violations by the Contras, alleged cocaine trafficking and the Iran–Contra affair.

=== Venezuela ===
During the 2025 United States naval deployment in the Caribbean, Trump stated that he had authorized the CIA to conduct covert operations in Venezuela, which Venezuelan president Nicolás Maduro denounced. The CIA conducted drone strikes in Venezuela in December 2025 and sent a team into Venezuela to track Maduro prior to his abduction.

== Asia and Oceania ==
=== China ===
Between 2010 and 2012, 30 CIA sources in China were lost due to arrests and executions.

=== Lebanon ===
William Blum has claimed that the CIA financed President Camille Chamoun during his run of the 1957 election. The CIA also funded the Arabic magazine Hiwar under the cover of the Congress for Cultural Freedom in the 1960s. Tim Weiner has claimed that during the Lebanese civil war that Christian leader Bashir Gemayel was on the CIA payroll and was a trusted source. The 1983 US embassy bombing in Beirut killed several 8 CIA agents and in 2023 the CIA called it the "deadliest day in CIA history". The role of the CIA in the 1985 Beirut car bombings has been debated.

=== Singapore ===
In 1961, the CIA attempted to infiltrate the Singapore Secret Police. They were discovered, and attempted to bribe the then prime minister Lee Kuan Yew to cover up the story. His complaint eventually led to the Secretary of State Dean Rusk apologizing for the CIA.

== Europe ==
=== Austria ===
In late August 2024, the CIA was credited with warning Austrian authorities of a planned terrorist attack by ISIS at a Taylor Swift concert.

=== Italy ===
The CIA worked to ensure the failure of the Italian Communist Party during the 1948 general election. According to Tim Weiner, $10 million was given to rival politicians, helping the Christian Democrats achieve victory.

=== Spain ===
The Spanish government suspected CIA involvement in the 2019 North Korean Embassy in Madrid incident. The defector organization Free Joseon broke into the North Korean Embassy in Madrid and stole hard drives before handing them over to the FBI.

== See also ==
- United States intelligence operations abroad
- United States involvement in regime change
