= Stop Watching Us =

Protest against mass surveillance

- Part of Reactions to global surveillance disclosures
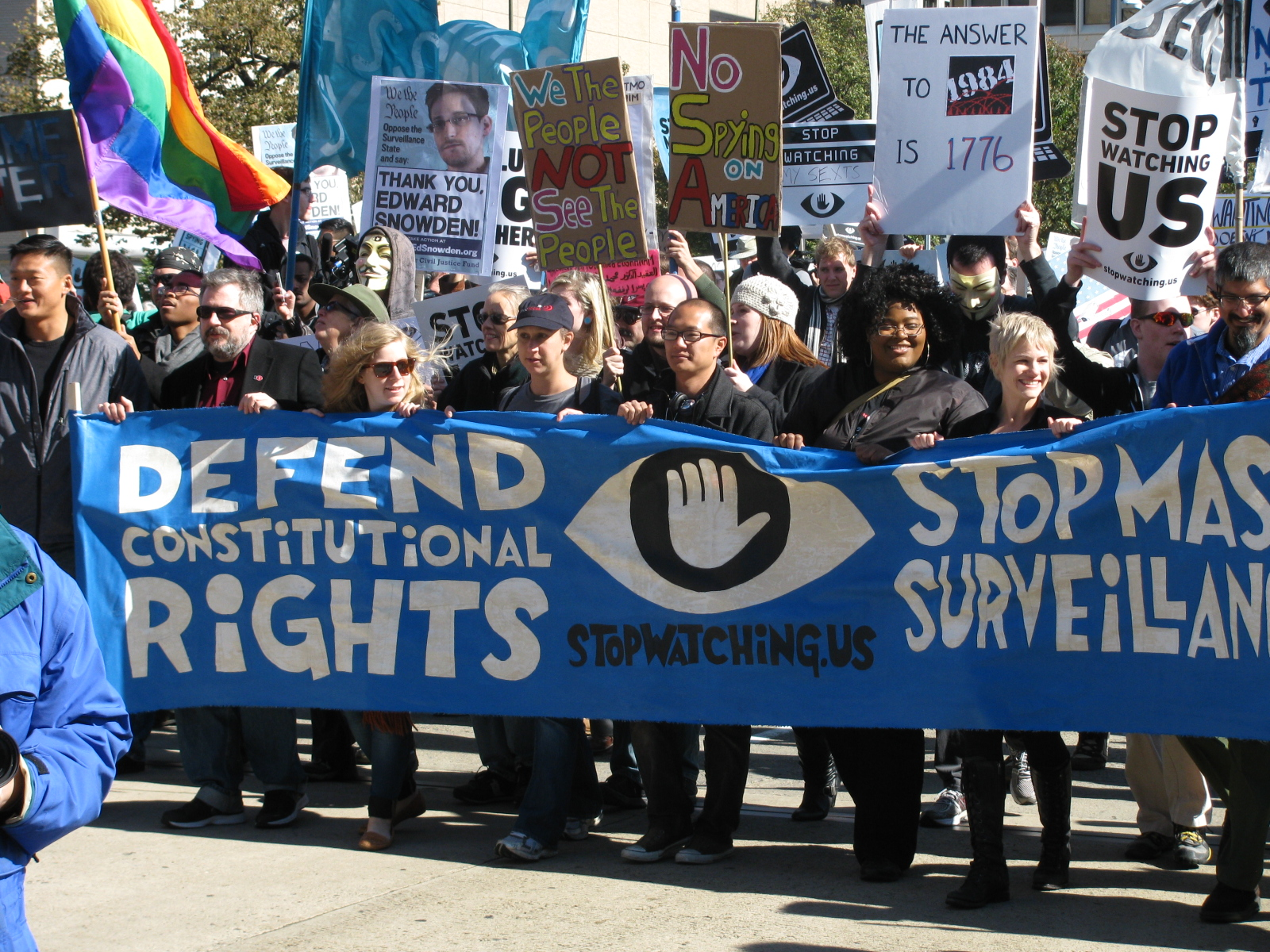
- "Stop Watching US" rally in Washington DC, October 26, 2013
- Date: October 26, 2013
- Location: Washington, DC, Cologne, Germany
- Caused by: Snowden leaks, Global surveillance
- Goals: Congress to reform Section 215 of the USA PATRIOT Act
- Methods: protest
- stopwatching.us archived March 2022 at Wayback Machine

Stop Watching Us was a protest effort against global surveillance that culminated in rallies on October 26, 2013.

== Open letter ==
The movement featured an open letter to the members of Congress. The letter calls upon Congress to:

Enact reform this Congress to Section 215 of the USA PATRIOT Act, the state secrets privilege, and the FISA Amendments Act to make clear that blanket surveillance of the Internet activity and phone records of any person residing in the U.S. is prohibited by law and that violations can be reviewed in adversarial proceedings before a public court;

Create a special committee to investigate, report, and reveal to the public the extent of this domestic spying. This committee should create specific recommendations for legal and regulatory reform to end unconstitutional surveillance;

Hold accountable those public officials who are found to be responsible for this unconstitutional surveillance.

According to the Stop Watching Us website, over 500,000 people have signed the petition.

== Public Service Announcement video ==
External videos
- Stop Watching Us: The Video

The EFF produced a 3-minute, 26-second public service announcement video (directed by Brian Knappenberger) promoting the movement. It featured a wide array of individuals: Actor John Cusack explained: "Everybody is at risk for getting caught up in the NSA dragnet – including average citizens not suspected of a crime." U.S. Representative John Conyers Jr., Professor Lawrence Lessig of Harvard Law School, activists David Segal of Demand Progress, Cindy Cohn of the EFF, Dan Choi, actors Maggie Gyllenhaal and Wil Wheaton, TV host Phil Donahue, and whistleblowers Daniel Ellsberg, Jesselyn Radack, Kirk Wiebe, Mark Klein, and Thomas Drake.

== October 2013 Rally ==
On October 26, 2013, a rally was held in Washington, DC, billed by organizers as the "largest rally yet to protest mass surveillance". A diverse coalition of over 100 advocacy groups organized the event and attracted thousands of protestors calling for an end to the mass surveillance made public by Edward Snowden.

According to the Guardian, the most popular sign was printed with the words "Thank you, Edward Snowden". Jesselyn Radack read a statement from Snowden which said, in part, "This isn't about red or blue party lines, and it definitely isn't about terrorism. It's about being able to live in a free and open society ... elections are coming up, and we are watching you", adding that elected officials should be "public servants, not private investigators." The American Civil Liberties Union ran a column detailing its involvement and quoting a statement Snowden had provided to them in support of the event.

Other speakers included former governor Gary Johnson and NSA whistleblower Thomas Drake. Drake addressed the crowd, saying in part, "It's time to roll back the surveillance state ... It is time for the U.S. government to stop watching us".

Protestors also gathered on the day for a Stop Watching Us demonstration in Cologne, Germany.

The date of the demonstration was 12th anniversary of the Patriot Act, which ultimately allowed for mass surveillance and bulk data collection. The "Stop Watching Us" website stated as a demand, the reform of "Section 215 of the USA PATRIOT Act, the state secrets privilege, and the FISA Amendments Act to make clear that blanket surveillance of the Internet activity and phone records of any person residing in the US is prohibited by law and that violations can be reviewed in adversarial proceedings before a public court." It also called for an investigation into the extent of domestic spying, and asked that officials found violating the constitution be brought to justice.

== Participants ==
Stop Watching Us was supported by over 85 organizations, including: Reddit, Electronic Frontier Foundation, Access, Internet Archive, Mozilla Foundation, World Wide Web Foundation, the American Library Association, Young Americans for Liberty, ColorOfChange.org, the Daily Kos, the Libertarian Party and the Green Party of the United States.

== Related protests ==
Stop Watching Us followed a series of rallies for Restore the Fourth in the summer of 2013, and was followed by The Day We Fight Back, "more of a digital protest", on February 11, 2014, all of which were compared by Digital Trends to efforts in 2011 which eventually halted the Stop Online Piracy Act. On January 17, 2014, when Barack Obama gave a speech on mass surveillance, protesters outside the Justice Department, who were described by one website as "Hundreds of Stop Watching Us activists", wore "STOP SPYING glasses" and held sign stating "Stop Spying on Us", "Big Brother In Chief" and "Obama = Tyranny."
