= Donald Rickard =

American diplomat (1928-2016)

- Donald C. Rickard
- Born: March 2, 1928; Rangoon, Burma
- Died: March 30, 2016 (aged 88)
- Occupations: American diplomat, spy for the Central Intelligence Agency
- Known for: Providing information that led to the arrest of Nelson Mandela

Donald C. Rickard (2 March 1928 – 30 March 2016) was an American diplomat for the State Department and spy for the Central Intelligence Agency. Shortly before his death, Rickard claimed to have provided the information that led to the arrest of Nelson Mandela in 1962 due to allegations of communist influence under Mandela while he was working as a vice-consul in Durban, South Africa.

== Early life ==
Donald Rickard was born in Rangoon, Burma (now Myanmar), on 2 March 1928 to Samuel Harmer Rickard Jr and Ada Thomas Rickard. Samuel Harmer Rickard Jr. was the Head of English Department and President of Judson College in Rangoon from 1925-41. In 1942, he and his parents and brothers had to leave the country urgently following the Japanese invasion of Burma, walking almost 200 miles to India where they made a new home. There, Donald and his brothers attended Woodstock Christian School in Mussoorie. The family later moved to the San Francisco Bay area where Rickard attended Piedmont High School and then San Jose State University. After the family moved to Pennsylvania, Rickard attended Bucknell University from where he graduated with a degree in political science before joining the U.S. State Department.

== Career ==
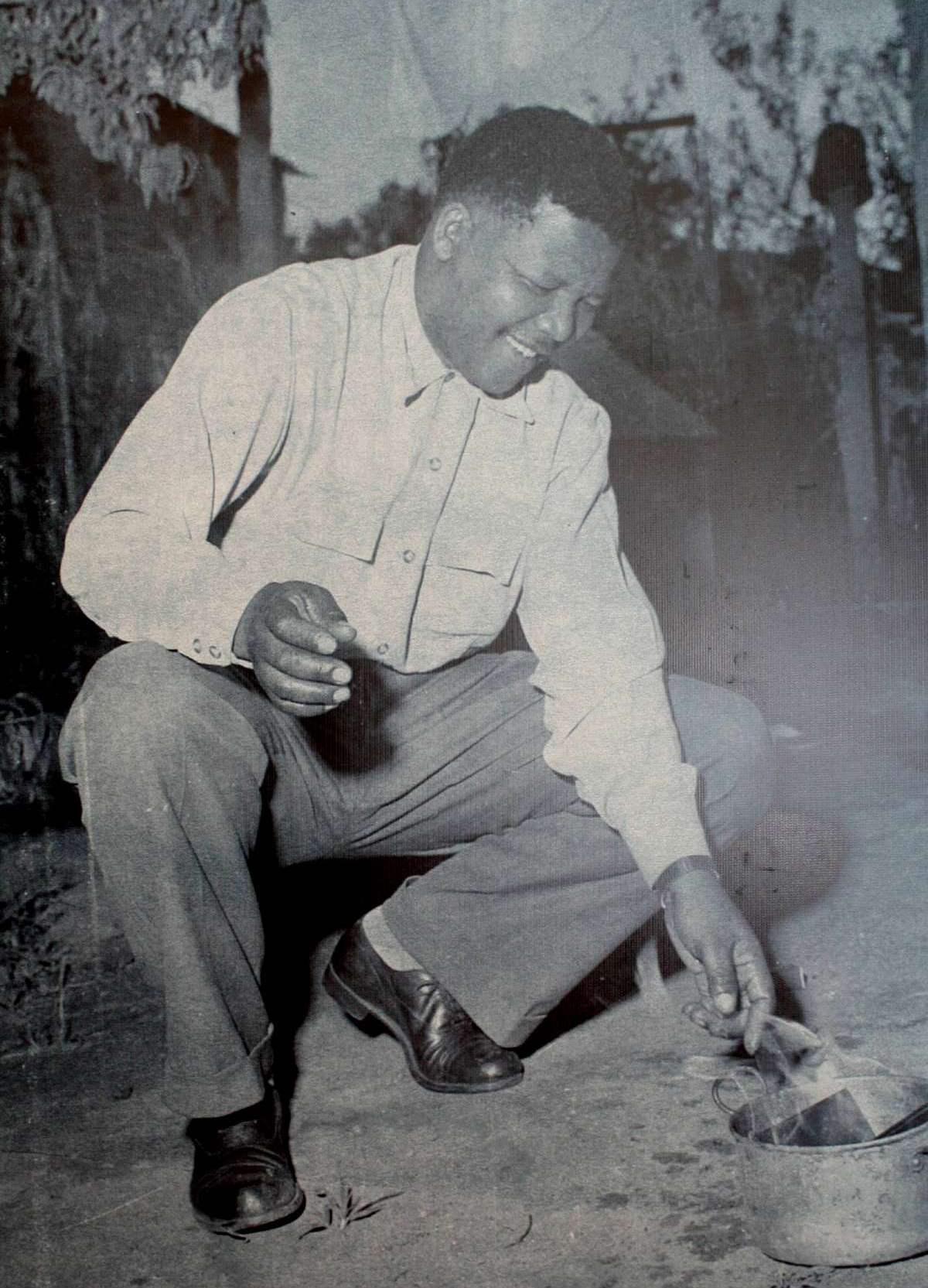
Nelson Mandela burning his pass in 1960.

Rickard had diplomatic appointments in Burma, Saipan, Pakistan and South Africa. He also worked for the State Department in Maryland and Washington, D.C., and in 1969 was a U.S. consular officer in Seoul, South Korea. Although a CIA agent, Rickard remained officially a State Department employee.

In 1958, Rickard was appointed American vice-consul in Durban, South Africa.

Mandela’s arrest

In an interview given shortly before his death to English film director John Irvin for the film Mandela's Gun, Rickard claimed to have been the person who tipped-off the South African security services about the location of Nelson Mandela using information he obtained from ANC informants. The tip-off resulted in Mandela's arrest on 5 August 1962 while traveling in a car from Durban to Johannesburg and has been seen as part of the US government's campaign against the African National Congress which they viewed as allied with communism. In the interview, Rickard described Mandela as "the world's most dangerous communist outside of the Soviet Union", and someone who "had to be stopped". After Mandela's arrest and conviction he was given a life sentence, serving 27 years before he was released. He went on to become South Africa's first post-apartheid president in 1994.

The US has long been rumored to have played an instrumental role in the 1962 arrest - the claims have been included in a number of books relating to the modern history of South Africa and Mandela's name remained on a US terror watch list until 2008 — more than a decade after he completed his term as the first president of South Africa.

National spokesman for the ANC, Zizi Kodwa, called Rickard's comments "a serious indictment", going on to say "We always knew there was always collaboration between some Western countries and the apartheid regime", and asserting that the CIA was still interfering in South African politics.

Rickard retired in 1978 and spent the rest of his life in Pagosa Springs, Colorado.

== Family ==
Rickard met Elaine Grove (died 2014) at Bucknell University and they married in September 1952. They had six children, Laura, Donald Rickard II, David, Diana, Nicolette, and Jennifer.

== Death ==
Rickard died on 30 March 2016. He was survived by his six children. A memorial service was held at St. Patrick's Episcopal Church in Pagosa .

== See also ==
- Mike Hoare
