= Fourth Amendment Restoration Act =

- Long title: A bill to stop the National Security Agency from spying on citizens of the United States and for other purposes.
- Announced in: the 113th United States Congress
- Sponsored by: Rand Paul

Legislative history
- Introduced in the Senate as S. 1121 by Rand Paul (R–KY) on June 7, 2013

The Fourth Amendment Restoration Act is a proposed bill introduced by Senator Rand Paul on June 7, 2013. It "provides that the Fourth Amendment to the Constitution shall not be construed to allow any U.S. government agency to search the phone records of Americans without a warrant based on probable cause."

The bill was authored in light of the Global Surveillance Disclosures of 2013, which Sen. Paul said "represents an outrageous abuse of power."

== Findings and enactment ==
The bill lists for findings of Congress:

(1) The Bill of Rights states in the 4th Amendment to the United States Constitution that `The right of the people to be secure in their persons, houses, papers, and effects, against unreasonable searches and seizures, shall not be violated, and no Warrants shall issue, but upon probable cause, supported by Oath or affirmation, and particularly describing the place to be searched, and the persons or things to be seized.'.
(2) Media reports indicate that the National Security Agency is currently collecting the phone records of American citizens.
(3) Media reports indicate that the National Security Agency has secured a top secret court order in April 2013 from a court established under section 103 of the Foreign Intelligence Surveillance Act of 1978 (50 U.S.C. 1803) for the telephone records of millions of American citizens.
(4) Media reports indicate that President Barack Obama's Administration has been collecting information about millions of citizens within the borders of the United States and between the United States and other countries.
(5) The collection of citizen's phone records is a violation of the natural rights of every man and woman in the United States, and a clear violation of the explicit language of the highest law of the land.

The bill then states: "The Fourth Amendment to the Constitution shall not be construed to allow any agency of the United States Government to search the phone records of Americans without a warrant based on probable cause."
