= FISA Improvements Act =

- Long title: A bill to consolidate the congressional oversight provisions of the Foreign Intelligence Surveillance Act of 1978 and for other purposes.
- Announced in: the 113th United States Congress
- Sponsored by: Dianne Feinstein
- Number of co-sponsors: 0

Legislative history
- Introduced in the Senate as S. 1631 by Dianne Feinstein (D–CA) on October 31, 2013; Committee consideration by United States Senate Select Committee on Intelligence

The FISA Improvements Act is a proposed act by Senator Dianne Feinstein, Chair of the Senate Intelligence Committee. Prompted by the disclosure of NSA surveillance by Edward Snowden, it would establish the surveillance program as legal, but impose some limitations on availability of the data. Opponents say the bill would codify warrantless access to many communications of American citizens for use by domestic law enforcement.

== Overview ==
In the wake of the Snowden disclosures, President Obama and many lawmakers believed that restoration of public trust would require legislative changes. More than 20 bills have been written with the goal of reining in government surveillance powers.

On October 28, 2013, Senator Dianne Feinstein, long described as a staunch defender of the National Security Agency (NSA), announced that a "total review of all intelligence programs is necessary".

A bill was introduced by Feinstein on October 31, 2013. Amendments were offered and rejected. The same day it was introduced, the bill passed the United States Senate Select Committee on Intelligence by a vote of 11-4. The committee's report on the bill was published on November 12.

Feinstein issued a press release saying that the bill would impose restrictions on how data is collected, including prohibiting bulk collection of the content of communications, and place a limit of five years on retention of the data. It would make unauthorized access to data obtained under the FISA orders punishable by ten years in prison. The bill would make the FISA court require "reasonable articulable suspicion" of association with international terrorism before records are reviewed. It also would set limits on the number of people with access to the data, and set limits on the number of "hops" (contact intermediaries) that can be searched. It would require the NSA to make an annual report of the number of queries made and the number of FBI investigations or probable cause orders issued. The bill would also require intelligence agencies to report violations of law to Congress, require a review once per by the Attorney General of collection procedures, and permit the FISA court to invite independent amicus curiae perspectives on cases. It would require Senate confirmation of appointments of the NSA director and NSA Inspector General.

MSNBC reported that the bill "purports to ban the NSA's controversial bulk collection of communications records under Section 215 of the Patriot Act" but "basically allows the NSA to continue bulk collection." Feinstein defended data collection in her press release, saying that "The threats we face—from terrorism, proliferation and cyber attack, among others—are real, and they will continue. Intelligence is necessary to protect our national and economic security, as well as to stop attacks against our friends and allies around the world."

== Response ==
=== Senate Intelligence Committee ===
The Senate Intelligence Committee report recommended the bill, saying that the program was "an effective counterterrorism tool" and "was determined by the Department of Justice in two Administrations and by at least fifteen different judges serving on the Foreign Intelligence Surveillance Court (FISC) to be lawful." While noting that the committee had encountered inadvertent violations of the law, the majority reported "It remains the case that, through seven years of oversight of this metadata program under Section 215, the Committee has not identified a single case in which a government official engaged in a willful effort to circumvent or violate Section 215 in the conduct of the bulk telephone metadata program." The committee endorsed measures to codify and enhance privacy protections, saying these measures "could not have been enacted absent the declassification of lawful intelligence activities that were, until recently, properly classified, as to do so would have revealed the programs to our adversaries and thereby compromised their effectiveness." However, it condemned the disclosures and said that the leaks "have not exposed government wrongdoing."

In a minority view attached to the report, Senators Ron Wyden, Mark Udall, and Martin Heinrich wrote "this bill would codify the government's authority to collect the phone records of huge numbers of law-abiding Americans, and also to conduct warrantless searches for individual Americans' phone calls and emails. We respectfully but firmly disagree with this approach." Feinstein's response in the report was that the bill "does not provide any new legislative authority with which the government may acquire call records or any other information under Section 215--in fact, it narrows the existing authority for it."

=== Interest groups ===
The American Civil Liberties Union (ACLU) urged opposition, calling the bill a "dream come true for the NSA". The Electronic Frontier Foundation (EFF) called the bill a "fake fix" that would "permanently entrench" current surveillance practices.

The ACLU and EFF were among fifty-four "civil liberties and public interest groups" that authored a coalition letter to Congressional leadership urging them to oppose the act.

=== Media ===
One area of concern raised by The Guardian, crediting blogger Marcy Wheeler, regards a "backdoor search provision" which could allow domestic U.S. law enforcement agencies warrantless access to the data. A FISA court document declassified in 2011 and a leak by Edward Snowden previously published by the newspaper indicated that generally searches of the database for "U. S. Persons" was not permitted, but contained a provision that:

"While the FAA 702 minimization procedures approved on 3 October 2011 now allow for use of certain United States person names and identifiers as query terms when reviewing collected FAA 702 data, analysts may NOT/NOT [not repeat not] implement any USP [US persons] queries until an effective oversight process has been developed by NSA and agreed to by DOJ/ODNI [Office of the Director of National Intelligence]."

According to The Guardian, Section 6 of the Act "blesses" such a procedure, permitting intelligence agencies to search "the contents of communications" collected overseas for U.S. persons provided that the purpose pertained to "foreign intelligence information". The provision was also criticized by Senator Ron Wyden, who said that the bill "would give intelligence agencies wide latitude to conduct warrantless searches for American phone calls and emails", instead supporting the USA Freedom Act by Senators Patrick Leahy and F. James Sensenbrenner that would require a search warrant to obtain the information. Sensenbrenner called Feinstein's bill an effort "for the first time in our country's history to allow unrestrained spying on the American people."

== See also ==
- USA Freedom Act, a legislative bill to end US government bulk collection.
