= Restore the Fourth =

Protest movement for civil liberties

- Abbreviation: RT4
- Formation: June 8, 2013, United States (incorporated 2014)
- Type: 501(c)(4) nonprofit corporation
- Purpose: Enforcement of Fourth Amendment rights
- Headquarters: Belmont, MA
- Region served: United States
- National Chair: Alex Marthews
- Main organ: Board of Directors
- Website: Official website

Restore the Fourth is an American 501(c)(4) nonprofit organization that seeks to strengthen the Fourth Amendment to the United States Constitution, which prohibits unreasonable searches and seizures, and to eliminate programs that violate it. It organized protests in 2013 & 2014, and in 2015, helped to introduce the Surveillance State Repeal Act.

== History ==
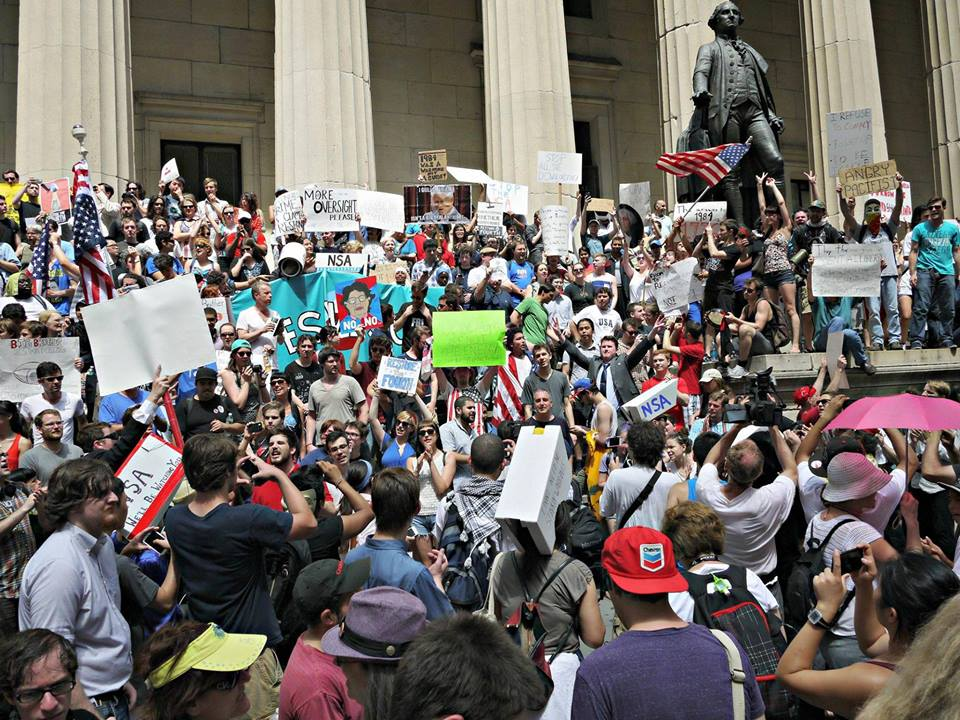
Restore the Fourth NYC

Restore the Fourth originated from the social media website Reddit, shortly after the information leak by Edward Snowden, which exposed the US National Security Agency's (NSA) mass surveillance programs, most notably the PRISM program. A Reddit subforum dedicated to the movement was created on June 8, 2013, garnering over 15,000 subscribers in 2 weeks. From there, Restore the Fourth moved to Snoonet, which is an IRC network for Reddit communities. Most movement organization efforts prior to July 4, 2013, occurred there, where local organizers, national organizers, and users from the subreddit collaborated.

The first Restore the Fourth protest occurred on June 30, 2013, in Madison, Wisconsin. Subsequent Independence Day protests occurred on July 4 with more than 70 local rallies across all 50 U.S. states and Washington, D.C. More than 400 protesters attended the rallies in Washington, D.C. and in New York City. In Munich, Germany, protesters gathered in front of the U.S. Consulate wearing Edward Snowden masks. Organizers estimated a national turnout of more than 10,000.

Further rallies were held on Orwell Day (August 4) to push for the passage of the USA Freedom Act and to call for the shutting down of the growing network of fusion centers across the United States.

From November 2013 to April 2014, the organization saw a period of significant turnover, before relaunching with national elections in May 2014 as a 501(c)(4) nonprofit with 25 chapters around the country, under the leadership of Alex Marthews.

== Operations ==
According to Restore the Fourth's bylaws, the organization seeks to:

- Educate the public in order to decrease support for warrantless and unconstitutional general warrant surveillance, and the bulk collection of private data for government surveillance purposes.
- Lobby public officials regarding policies and laws identified above.
- Provide educational, financial, and organizational support to Restore the Fourth chapters.

== Reception ==
Restore the Fourth had received support from the Electronic Frontier Foundation, Sen. Rand Paul, Judge Andrew Napolitano, and DuckDuckGo.

The NSA addressed the July 4 protest in a statement, saying: "The Fourth of July reminds us as Americans of the freedoms and rights all citizens of our country are guaranteed by our Constitution. Among those is freedom of speech, often exercised in protests of various kinds. NSA does not object to any lawful, peaceful protest."

== See also ==
- Fourth Amendment Protection Act
